

344001–344100 

|-bgcolor=#C2FFFF
| 344001 ||  || — || November 11, 2001 || Kitt Peak || Spacewatch || L5 || align=right | 10 km || 
|-id=002 bgcolor=#C2FFFF
| 344002 ||  || — || September 23, 2000 || Socorro || LINEAR || L5 || align=right | 13 km || 
|-id=003 bgcolor=#C2FFFF
| 344003 ||  || — || June 9, 2011 || Haleakala || Pan-STARRS || L5 || align=right | 10 km || 
|-id=004 bgcolor=#C2FFFF
| 344004 ||  || — || December 21, 2003 || Kitt Peak || Spacewatch || L5 || align=right | 11 km || 
|-id=005 bgcolor=#C2FFFF
| 344005 ||  || — || January 26, 2006 || Kitt Peak || Spacewatch || L5 || align=right | 8.4 km || 
|-id=006 bgcolor=#C2FFFF
| 344006 ||  || — || June 19, 2010 || Mount Lemmon || Mount Lemmon Survey || L5 || align=right | 6.0 km || 
|-id=007 bgcolor=#d6d6d6
| 344007 ||  || — || October 4, 2006 || Mount Lemmon || Mount Lemmon Survey || — || align=right | 4.5 km || 
|-id=008 bgcolor=#d6d6d6
| 344008 ||  || — || September 20, 2001 || Socorro || LINEAR || — || align=right | 4.5 km || 
|-id=009 bgcolor=#E9E9E9
| 344009 ||  || — || November 13, 2007 || Mount Lemmon || Mount Lemmon Survey || — || align=right | 2.2 km || 
|-id=010 bgcolor=#d6d6d6
| 344010 ||  || — || April 20, 2009 || Kitt Peak || Spacewatch || URS || align=right | 3.4 km || 
|-id=011 bgcolor=#E9E9E9
| 344011 ||  || — || February 8, 1995 || Kitt Peak || Spacewatch || — || align=right | 2.9 km || 
|-id=012 bgcolor=#E9E9E9
| 344012 ||  || — || January 27, 2004 || Kitt Peak || Spacewatch || — || align=right | 1.8 km || 
|-id=013 bgcolor=#d6d6d6
| 344013 ||  || — || January 11, 2002 || Kitt Peak || Spacewatch || URS || align=right | 5.1 km || 
|-id=014 bgcolor=#C2FFFF
| 344014 ||  || — || July 28, 2009 || Kitt Peak || Spacewatch || L4 || align=right | 10 km || 
|-id=015 bgcolor=#fefefe
| 344015 ||  || — || April 12, 2005 || Kitt Peak || Spacewatch || NYS || align=right data-sort-value="0.67" | 670 m || 
|-id=016 bgcolor=#d6d6d6
| 344016 ||  || — || August 21, 2004 || Siding Spring || SSS || — || align=right | 3.8 km || 
|-id=017 bgcolor=#d6d6d6
| 344017 ||  || — || April 19, 2007 || Kitt Peak || Spacewatch || — || align=right | 5.5 km || 
|-id=018 bgcolor=#E9E9E9
| 344018 ||  || — || February 10, 2008 || Mount Lemmon || Mount Lemmon Survey || — || align=right | 1.8 km || 
|-id=019 bgcolor=#fefefe
| 344019 ||  || — || December 19, 2003 || Socorro || LINEAR || NYS || align=right data-sort-value="0.81" | 810 m || 
|-id=020 bgcolor=#E9E9E9
| 344020 ||  || — || December 21, 2006 || Mount Lemmon || Mount Lemmon Survey || — || align=right | 2.2 km || 
|-id=021 bgcolor=#E9E9E9
| 344021 ||  || — || October 23, 2006 || Mount Lemmon || Mount Lemmon Survey || — || align=right | 1.8 km || 
|-id=022 bgcolor=#fefefe
| 344022 ||  || — || August 19, 2006 || Kitt Peak || Spacewatch || — || align=right data-sort-value="0.77" | 770 m || 
|-id=023 bgcolor=#d6d6d6
| 344023 ||  || — || February 24, 2006 || Kitt Peak || Spacewatch || — || align=right | 3.2 km || 
|-id=024 bgcolor=#d6d6d6
| 344024 ||  || — || January 31, 2006 || Catalina || CSS || — || align=right | 3.5 km || 
|-id=025 bgcolor=#fefefe
| 344025 ||  || — || March 3, 2005 || Kitt Peak || Spacewatch || FLO || align=right data-sort-value="0.71" | 710 m || 
|-id=026 bgcolor=#E9E9E9
| 344026 ||  || — || October 12, 2001 || Kitt Peak || Spacewatch || — || align=right | 1.2 km || 
|-id=027 bgcolor=#fefefe
| 344027 ||  || — || July 6, 2002 || Palomar || NEAT || H || align=right data-sort-value="0.93" | 930 m || 
|-id=028 bgcolor=#d6d6d6
| 344028 ||  || — || April 2, 2006 || Mount Lemmon || Mount Lemmon Survey || — || align=right | 2.8 km || 
|-id=029 bgcolor=#E9E9E9
| 344029 ||  || — || February 13, 2002 || Apache Point || SDSS || WIT || align=right | 1.1 km || 
|-id=030 bgcolor=#d6d6d6
| 344030 ||  || — || September 18, 2009 || Mount Lemmon || Mount Lemmon Survey || — || align=right | 3.5 km || 
|-id=031 bgcolor=#d6d6d6
| 344031 ||  || — || January 12, 2010 || Mount Lemmon || Mount Lemmon Survey || — || align=right | 3.2 km || 
|-id=032 bgcolor=#d6d6d6
| 344032 ||  || — || September 29, 2009 || Mount Lemmon || Mount Lemmon Survey || VER || align=right | 3.5 km || 
|-id=033 bgcolor=#E9E9E9
| 344033 ||  || — || October 30, 2005 || Mount Lemmon || Mount Lemmon Survey || — || align=right | 1.6 km || 
|-id=034 bgcolor=#fefefe
| 344034 ||  || — || September 9, 2001 || Anderson Mesa || LONEOS || — || align=right | 1.2 km || 
|-id=035 bgcolor=#E9E9E9
| 344035 ||  || — || December 18, 2001 || Apache Point || SDSS || — || align=right | 1.4 km || 
|-id=036 bgcolor=#fefefe
| 344036 ||  || — || June 17, 2004 || Palomar || NEAT || — || align=right | 1.1 km || 
|-id=037 bgcolor=#E9E9E9
| 344037 ||  || — || December 7, 1999 || Kitt Peak || Spacewatch || — || align=right | 2.1 km || 
|-id=038 bgcolor=#E9E9E9
| 344038 ||  || — || September 11, 2004 || Kitt Peak || Spacewatch || — || align=right | 1.0 km || 
|-id=039 bgcolor=#d6d6d6
| 344039 ||  || — || June 22, 2006 || Mount Lemmon || Mount Lemmon Survey || VER || align=right | 3.8 km || 
|-id=040 bgcolor=#fefefe
| 344040 ||  || — || May 23, 2001 || Cerro Tololo || L. H. Wasserman || — || align=right | 1.2 km || 
|-id=041 bgcolor=#fefefe
| 344041 ||  || — || August 24, 2005 || Palomar || NEAT || FLO || align=right data-sort-value="0.74" | 740 m || 
|-id=042 bgcolor=#d6d6d6
| 344042 ||  || — || July 7, 2007 || Lulin Observatory || Lulin Obs. || — || align=right | 2.9 km || 
|-id=043 bgcolor=#d6d6d6
| 344043 ||  || — || October 26, 2008 || Kitt Peak || Spacewatch || — || align=right | 3.2 km || 
|-id=044 bgcolor=#E9E9E9
| 344044 ||  || — || September 1, 2003 || Socorro || LINEAR || — || align=right | 3.1 km || 
|-id=045 bgcolor=#E9E9E9
| 344045 ||  || — || December 11, 2004 || Socorro || LINEAR || — || align=right | 2.0 km || 
|-id=046 bgcolor=#E9E9E9
| 344046 ||  || — || June 24, 1995 || Kitt Peak || Spacewatch || — || align=right | 2.1 km || 
|-id=047 bgcolor=#fefefe
| 344047 || 4331 P-L || — || September 24, 1960 || Palomar || PLS || — || align=right data-sort-value="0.67" | 670 m || 
|-id=048 bgcolor=#E9E9E9
| 344048 || 6807 P-L || — || September 24, 1960 || Palomar || PLS || DOR || align=right | 2.6 km || 
|-id=049 bgcolor=#E9E9E9
| 344049 || 6865 P-L || — || September 24, 1960 || Palomar || PLS || — || align=right | 1.5 km || 
|-id=050 bgcolor=#fefefe
| 344050 || 1254 T-2 || — || September 29, 1973 || Palomar || PLS || ERI || align=right | 1.5 km || 
|-id=051 bgcolor=#E9E9E9
| 344051 || 4074 T-2 || — || September 29, 1973 || Palomar || PLS || — || align=right | 1.5 km || 
|-id=052 bgcolor=#d6d6d6
| 344052 || 4121 T-2 || — || September 29, 1973 || Palomar || PLS || — || align=right | 2.8 km || 
|-id=053 bgcolor=#E9E9E9
| 344053 || 5478 T-2 || — || September 30, 1973 || Palomar || PLS || — || align=right | 2.3 km || 
|-id=054 bgcolor=#d6d6d6
| 344054 || 4185 T-3 || — || October 16, 1977 || Palomar || PLS || HYG || align=right | 3.5 km || 
|-id=055 bgcolor=#fefefe
| 344055 || 4530 T-3 || — || October 16, 1977 || Palomar || PLS || FLO || align=right data-sort-value="0.88" | 880 m || 
|-id=056 bgcolor=#E9E9E9
| 344056 ||  || — || April 30, 1992 || San Pedro Mártir || OAN Mexico || — || align=right | 3.7 km || 
|-id=057 bgcolor=#E9E9E9
| 344057 ||  || — || August 20, 1993 || La Silla || E. W. Elst || — || align=right | 3.0 km || 
|-id=058 bgcolor=#fefefe
| 344058 ||  || — || August 12, 1994 || La Silla || E. W. Elst || — || align=right | 1.8 km || 
|-id=059 bgcolor=#fefefe
| 344059 ||  || — || September 28, 1994 || Kitt Peak || Spacewatch || — || align=right data-sort-value="0.86" | 860 m || 
|-id=060 bgcolor=#E9E9E9
| 344060 || 1995 OL || — || July 23, 1995 || Ondřejov || P. Pravec || — || align=right | 1.7 km || 
|-id=061 bgcolor=#d6d6d6
| 344061 ||  || — || July 27, 1995 || Kitt Peak || Spacewatch || — || align=right | 2.5 km || 
|-id=062 bgcolor=#fefefe
| 344062 ||  || — || July 26, 1995 || Kitt Peak || Spacewatch || — || align=right data-sort-value="0.75" | 750 m || 
|-id=063 bgcolor=#E9E9E9
| 344063 ||  || — || September 18, 1995 || Kitt Peak || Spacewatch || — || align=right data-sort-value="0.98" | 980 m || 
|-id=064 bgcolor=#fefefe
| 344064 ||  || — || September 26, 1995 || Kitt Peak || Spacewatch || — || align=right data-sort-value="0.73" | 730 m || 
|-id=065 bgcolor=#FA8072
| 344065 ||  || — || October 20, 1995 || Oizumi || T. Kobayashi || — || align=right | 1.6 km || 
|-id=066 bgcolor=#fefefe
| 344066 ||  || — || October 17, 1995 || Kitt Peak || Spacewatch || — || align=right data-sort-value="0.65" | 650 m || 
|-id=067 bgcolor=#d6d6d6
| 344067 ||  || — || November 23, 1995 || Kitt Peak || Spacewatch || VER || align=right | 3.2 km || 
|-id=068 bgcolor=#d6d6d6
| 344068 ||  || — || December 18, 1995 || Kitt Peak || Spacewatch || — || align=right | 3.4 km || 
|-id=069 bgcolor=#fefefe
| 344069 ||  || — || January 18, 1996 || Kitt Peak || Spacewatch || — || align=right data-sort-value="0.85" | 850 m || 
|-id=070 bgcolor=#d6d6d6
| 344070 ||  || — || November 9, 1996 || Kitt Peak || Spacewatch || — || align=right | 3.0 km || 
|-id=071 bgcolor=#d6d6d6
| 344071 ||  || — || December 4, 1996 || Kitt Peak || Spacewatch || — || align=right | 2.7 km || 
|-id=072 bgcolor=#FA8072
| 344072 ||  || — || February 2, 1997 || Kitt Peak || Spacewatch || — || align=right data-sort-value="0.81" | 810 m || 
|-id=073 bgcolor=#d6d6d6
| 344073 ||  || — || February 6, 1997 || Kitt Peak || Spacewatch || — || align=right | 3.6 km || 
|-id=074 bgcolor=#FFC2E0
| 344074 ||  || — || October 29, 1997 || Haleakala || NEAT || ATEcritical || align=right data-sort-value="0.62" | 620 m || 
|-id=075 bgcolor=#fefefe
| 344075 ||  || — || November 21, 1997 || Kitt Peak || Spacewatch || — || align=right data-sort-value="0.92" | 920 m || 
|-id=076 bgcolor=#FFC2E0
| 344076 ||  || — || April 19, 1998 || Socorro || LINEAR || APOPHAcritical || align=right data-sort-value="0.62" | 620 m || 
|-id=077 bgcolor=#FA8072
| 344077 ||  || — || April 21, 1998 || Kitt Peak || Spacewatch || — || align=right data-sort-value="0.81" | 810 m || 
|-id=078 bgcolor=#fefefe
| 344078 ||  || — || August 25, 1998 || Ondřejov || L. Kotková || — || align=right data-sort-value="0.98" | 980 m || 
|-id=079 bgcolor=#fefefe
| 344079 ||  || — || September 13, 1998 || Kitt Peak || Spacewatch || — || align=right | 1.1 km || 
|-id=080 bgcolor=#E9E9E9
| 344080 ||  || — || September 14, 1998 || Socorro || LINEAR || — || align=right | 2.6 km || 
|-id=081 bgcolor=#E9E9E9
| 344081 ||  || — || September 17, 1998 || Kitt Peak || Spacewatch || WIT || align=right data-sort-value="0.88" | 880 m || 
|-id=082 bgcolor=#E9E9E9
| 344082 ||  || — || September 21, 1998 || Kitt Peak || Spacewatch || AGN || align=right | 1.1 km || 
|-id=083 bgcolor=#E9E9E9
| 344083 ||  || — || October 13, 1998 || Kitt Peak || Spacewatch || HOF || align=right | 2.7 km || 
|-id=084 bgcolor=#E9E9E9
| 344084 ||  || — || October 15, 1998 || Kitt Peak || Spacewatch || AEO || align=right | 1.3 km || 
|-id=085 bgcolor=#fefefe
| 344085 ||  || — || October 22, 1998 || Kitt Peak || Spacewatch || FLO || align=right data-sort-value="0.66" | 660 m || 
|-id=086 bgcolor=#fefefe
| 344086 ||  || — || January 7, 1999 || Kitt Peak || Spacewatch || CLA || align=right | 1.5 km || 
|-id=087 bgcolor=#fefefe
| 344087 ||  || — || February 6, 1999 || Mauna Kea || C. Veillet || — || align=right data-sort-value="0.81" | 810 m || 
|-id=088 bgcolor=#d6d6d6
| 344088 ||  || — || February 12, 1999 || Kitt Peak || Spacewatch || — || align=right | 2.1 km || 
|-id=089 bgcolor=#fefefe
| 344089 ||  || — || May 10, 1999 || Socorro || LINEAR || — || align=right | 1.6 km || 
|-id=090 bgcolor=#fefefe
| 344090 ||  || — || May 14, 1999 || Socorro || LINEAR || — || align=right | 1.3 km || 
|-id=091 bgcolor=#E9E9E9
| 344091 ||  || — || June 11, 1999 || Kitt Peak || Spacewatch || — || align=right | 1.8 km || 
|-id=092 bgcolor=#E9E9E9
| 344092 ||  || — || July 12, 1999 || Socorro || LINEAR || EUN || align=right | 2.3 km || 
|-id=093 bgcolor=#FA8072
| 344093 ||  || — || September 6, 1999 || Anderson Mesa || LONEOS || — || align=right data-sort-value="0.89" | 890 m || 
|-id=094 bgcolor=#E9E9E9
| 344094 ||  || — || September 9, 1999 || Socorro || LINEAR || — || align=right | 1.4 km || 
|-id=095 bgcolor=#fefefe
| 344095 ||  || — || September 9, 1999 || Socorro || LINEAR || — || align=right data-sort-value="0.81" | 810 m || 
|-id=096 bgcolor=#E9E9E9
| 344096 ||  || — || September 8, 1999 || Catalina || CSS || — || align=right | 1.7 km || 
|-id=097 bgcolor=#E9E9E9
| 344097 ||  || — || September 7, 1999 || Kitt Peak || Spacewatch || — || align=right data-sort-value="0.94" | 940 m || 
|-id=098 bgcolor=#E9E9E9
| 344098 ||  || — || September 13, 1999 || Socorro || LINEAR || IAN || align=right | 1.4 km || 
|-id=099 bgcolor=#E9E9E9
| 344099 ||  || — || October 2, 1999 || Socorro || LINEAR || — || align=right | 1.8 km || 
|-id=100 bgcolor=#E9E9E9
| 344100 ||  || — || October 4, 1999 || Socorro || LINEAR || — || align=right | 2.9 km || 
|}

344101–344200 

|-bgcolor=#E9E9E9
| 344101 ||  || — || October 7, 1999 || Kitt Peak || Spacewatch || — || align=right | 1.6 km || 
|-id=102 bgcolor=#E9E9E9
| 344102 ||  || — || October 2, 1999 || Socorro || LINEAR || — || align=right | 2.2 km || 
|-id=103 bgcolor=#E9E9E9
| 344103 ||  || — || October 4, 1999 || Socorro || LINEAR || — || align=right | 2.0 km || 
|-id=104 bgcolor=#E9E9E9
| 344104 ||  || — || October 7, 1999 || Socorro || LINEAR || — || align=right | 1.5 km || 
|-id=105 bgcolor=#E9E9E9
| 344105 ||  || — || October 7, 1999 || Socorro || LINEAR || EUN || align=right | 1.3 km || 
|-id=106 bgcolor=#E9E9E9
| 344106 ||  || — || October 4, 1999 || Kitt Peak || Spacewatch || — || align=right | 1.7 km || 
|-id=107 bgcolor=#E9E9E9
| 344107 ||  || — || October 4, 1999 || Catalina || CSS || — || align=right | 2.6 km || 
|-id=108 bgcolor=#E9E9E9
| 344108 ||  || — || October 13, 1999 || Socorro || LINEAR || RAF || align=right | 1.1 km || 
|-id=109 bgcolor=#fefefe
| 344109 ||  || — || October 15, 1999 || Kitt Peak || Spacewatch || — || align=right data-sort-value="0.56" | 560 m || 
|-id=110 bgcolor=#E9E9E9
| 344110 ||  || — || October 3, 1999 || Catalina || CSS || EUN || align=right | 1.5 km || 
|-id=111 bgcolor=#E9E9E9
| 344111 ||  || — || October 30, 1999 || Kitt Peak || Spacewatch || — || align=right | 2.2 km || 
|-id=112 bgcolor=#FA8072
| 344112 ||  || — || November 1, 1999 || Catalina || CSS || — || align=right | 1.9 km || 
|-id=113 bgcolor=#E9E9E9
| 344113 ||  || — || November 1, 1999 || Kitt Peak || Spacewatch || — || align=right | 1.9 km || 
|-id=114 bgcolor=#E9E9E9
| 344114 ||  || — || October 10, 1999 || Socorro || LINEAR || — || align=right | 1.5 km || 
|-id=115 bgcolor=#E9E9E9
| 344115 ||  || — || November 15, 1999 || Eskridge || Farpoint Obs. || — || align=right | 1.5 km || 
|-id=116 bgcolor=#E9E9E9
| 344116 ||  || — || October 6, 1999 || Kitt Peak || Spacewatch || HNS || align=right | 1.4 km || 
|-id=117 bgcolor=#E9E9E9
| 344117 ||  || — || November 4, 1999 || Kitt Peak || Spacewatch || — || align=right | 1.8 km || 
|-id=118 bgcolor=#fefefe
| 344118 ||  || — || November 4, 1999 || Kitt Peak || Spacewatch || V || align=right data-sort-value="0.84" | 840 m || 
|-id=119 bgcolor=#E9E9E9
| 344119 ||  || — || November 11, 1999 || Kitt Peak || Spacewatch || — || align=right | 2.0 km || 
|-id=120 bgcolor=#E9E9E9
| 344120 ||  || — || November 10, 1999 || Kitt Peak || Spacewatch || HEN || align=right | 1.0 km || 
|-id=121 bgcolor=#fefefe
| 344121 ||  || — || October 1, 1999 || Kitt Peak || Spacewatch || — || align=right data-sort-value="0.85" | 850 m || 
|-id=122 bgcolor=#E9E9E9
| 344122 ||  || — || October 30, 1999 || Kitt Peak || Spacewatch || EUN || align=right | 1.5 km || 
|-id=123 bgcolor=#E9E9E9
| 344123 ||  || — || October 8, 1999 || Socorro || LINEAR || — || align=right | 2.2 km || 
|-id=124 bgcolor=#fefefe
| 344124 ||  || — || November 12, 1999 || Socorro || LINEAR || — || align=right data-sort-value="0.74" | 740 m || 
|-id=125 bgcolor=#E9E9E9
| 344125 ||  || — || December 5, 1999 || Socorro || LINEAR || HNS || align=right | 1.9 km || 
|-id=126 bgcolor=#fefefe
| 344126 ||  || — || December 7, 1999 || Socorro || LINEAR || H || align=right | 1.1 km || 
|-id=127 bgcolor=#E9E9E9
| 344127 ||  || — || December 6, 1999 || Socorro || LINEAR || — || align=right | 2.0 km || 
|-id=128 bgcolor=#E9E9E9
| 344128 ||  || — || December 7, 1999 || Socorro || LINEAR || — || align=right | 1.6 km || 
|-id=129 bgcolor=#fefefe
| 344129 ||  || — || December 7, 1999 || Kitt Peak || Spacewatch || FLO || align=right data-sort-value="0.74" | 740 m || 
|-id=130 bgcolor=#d6d6d6
| 344130 ||  || — || December 3, 1999 || Kitt Peak || Spacewatch || 7:4 || align=right | 4.8 km || 
|-id=131 bgcolor=#E9E9E9
| 344131 ||  || — || December 27, 1999 || Kitt Peak || Spacewatch || — || align=right | 1.5 km || 
|-id=132 bgcolor=#FA8072
| 344132 ||  || — || December 31, 1999 || Socorro || LINEAR || — || align=right | 3.3 km || 
|-id=133 bgcolor=#FFC2E0
| 344133 ||  || — || January 4, 2000 || Socorro || LINEAR || AMO || align=right data-sort-value="0.74" | 740 m || 
|-id=134 bgcolor=#E9E9E9
| 344134 ||  || — || January 7, 2000 || Socorro || LINEAR || BRU || align=right | 3.5 km || 
|-id=135 bgcolor=#E9E9E9
| 344135 ||  || — || January 28, 2000 || Kitt Peak || Spacewatch || — || align=right | 2.6 km || 
|-id=136 bgcolor=#E9E9E9
| 344136 ||  || — || February 2, 2000 || Socorro || LINEAR || — || align=right | 2.3 km || 
|-id=137 bgcolor=#E9E9E9
| 344137 ||  || — || February 29, 2000 || Socorro || LINEAR || — || align=right | 2.4 km || 
|-id=138 bgcolor=#E9E9E9
| 344138 ||  || — || March 6, 2000 || Haleakala || NEAT || — || align=right | 3.1 km || 
|-id=139 bgcolor=#fefefe
| 344139 ||  || — || April 4, 2000 || Anderson Mesa || LONEOS || ERI || align=right | 2.4 km || 
|-id=140 bgcolor=#fefefe
| 344140 ||  || — || April 29, 2000 || Socorro || LINEAR || H || align=right data-sort-value="0.92" | 920 m || 
|-id=141 bgcolor=#d6d6d6
| 344141 ||  || — || April 26, 2000 || Kitt Peak || Spacewatch || TRP || align=right | 2.7 km || 
|-id=142 bgcolor=#fefefe
| 344142 ||  || — || April 26, 2000 || Anderson Mesa || LONEOS || NYS || align=right data-sort-value="0.75" | 750 m || 
|-id=143 bgcolor=#FFC2E0
| 344143 ||  || — || May 4, 2000 || Socorro || LINEAR || AMO +1km || align=right data-sort-value="0.81" | 810 m || 
|-id=144 bgcolor=#fefefe
| 344144 ||  || — || May 28, 2000 || Socorro || LINEAR || NYS || align=right data-sort-value="0.79" | 790 m || 
|-id=145 bgcolor=#E9E9E9
| 344145 ||  || — || May 24, 2000 || Kitt Peak || Spacewatch || AGN || align=right | 1.5 km || 
|-id=146 bgcolor=#FA8072
| 344146 ||  || — || July 10, 2000 || Anderson Mesa || LONEOS || — || align=right | 5.5 km || 
|-id=147 bgcolor=#FA8072
| 344147 ||  || — || August 3, 2000 || Socorro || LINEAR || — || align=right data-sort-value="0.85" | 850 m || 
|-id=148 bgcolor=#fefefe
| 344148 ||  || — || August 24, 2000 || Socorro || LINEAR || — || align=right data-sort-value="0.97" | 970 m || 
|-id=149 bgcolor=#fefefe
| 344149 ||  || — || August 27, 2000 || Kvistaberg || UDAS || — || align=right | 1.2 km || 
|-id=150 bgcolor=#FA8072
| 344150 ||  || — || August 31, 2000 || Socorro || LINEAR || critical || align=right data-sort-value="0.78" | 780 m || 
|-id=151 bgcolor=#FA8072
| 344151 ||  || — || September 20, 2000 || Socorro || LINEAR || — || align=right data-sort-value="0.69" | 690 m || 
|-id=152 bgcolor=#fefefe
| 344152 ||  || — || September 23, 2000 || Socorro || LINEAR || — || align=right data-sort-value="0.96" | 960 m || 
|-id=153 bgcolor=#fefefe
| 344153 ||  || — || September 24, 2000 || Socorro || LINEAR || NYS || align=right data-sort-value="0.76" | 760 m || 
|-id=154 bgcolor=#fefefe
| 344154 ||  || — || October 2, 2000 || Anderson Mesa || LONEOS || — || align=right | 1.2 km || 
|-id=155 bgcolor=#fefefe
| 344155 ||  || — || October 25, 2000 || Socorro || LINEAR || — || align=right | 1.2 km || 
|-id=156 bgcolor=#fefefe
| 344156 ||  || — || November 1, 2000 || Socorro || LINEAR || — || align=right | 1.1 km || 
|-id=157 bgcolor=#E9E9E9
| 344157 ||  || — || November 27, 2000 || Kitt Peak || Spacewatch || — || align=right | 1.2 km || 
|-id=158 bgcolor=#E9E9E9
| 344158 ||  || — || November 21, 2000 || Socorro || LINEAR || HNS || align=right | 1.7 km || 
|-id=159 bgcolor=#E9E9E9
| 344159 ||  || — || November 20, 2000 || Socorro || LINEAR || — || align=right | 2.0 km || 
|-id=160 bgcolor=#E9E9E9
| 344160 ||  || — || November 30, 2000 || Socorro || LINEAR || — || align=right | 1.7 km || 
|-id=161 bgcolor=#FA8072
| 344161 ||  || — || December 20, 2000 || Socorro || LINEAR || — || align=right | 1.5 km || 
|-id=162 bgcolor=#E9E9E9
| 344162 ||  || — || December 22, 2000 || Kitt Peak || Spacewatch || — || align=right | 1.4 km || 
|-id=163 bgcolor=#E9E9E9
| 344163 ||  || — || December 30, 2000 || Socorro || LINEAR || — || align=right | 1.9 km || 
|-id=164 bgcolor=#E9E9E9
| 344164 ||  || — || December 30, 2000 || Socorro || LINEAR || — || align=right | 1.5 km || 
|-id=165 bgcolor=#E9E9E9
| 344165 ||  || — || December 30, 2000 || Socorro || LINEAR || — || align=right | 1.6 km || 
|-id=166 bgcolor=#E9E9E9
| 344166 ||  || — || December 30, 2000 || Socorro || LINEAR || — || align=right | 1.9 km || 
|-id=167 bgcolor=#E9E9E9
| 344167 ||  || — || December 30, 2000 || Socorro || LINEAR || MAR || align=right | 1.9 km || 
|-id=168 bgcolor=#E9E9E9
| 344168 ||  || — || December 27, 2000 || Kitt Peak || Spacewatch || — || align=right | 2.1 km || 
|-id=169 bgcolor=#E9E9E9
| 344169 ||  || — || January 1, 2001 || Kitt Peak || Spacewatch || — || align=right | 1.3 km || 
|-id=170 bgcolor=#FA8072
| 344170 ||  || — || January 5, 2001 || Socorro || LINEAR || H || align=right data-sort-value="0.86" | 860 m || 
|-id=171 bgcolor=#E9E9E9
| 344171 ||  || — || January 15, 2001 || Socorro || LINEAR || BAR || align=right | 1.3 km || 
|-id=172 bgcolor=#E9E9E9
| 344172 ||  || — || January 14, 2001 || Kitt Peak || Spacewatch || IAN || align=right | 1.0 km || 
|-id=173 bgcolor=#E9E9E9
| 344173 ||  || — || January 20, 2001 || Socorro || LINEAR || — || align=right | 2.0 km || 
|-id=174 bgcolor=#E9E9E9
| 344174 ||  || — || January 20, 2001 || Socorro || LINEAR || MAR || align=right | 1.8 km || 
|-id=175 bgcolor=#E9E9E9
| 344175 ||  || — || January 20, 2001 || Socorro || LINEAR || — || align=right | 1.1 km || 
|-id=176 bgcolor=#E9E9E9
| 344176 ||  || — || January 17, 2001 || Haleakala || NEAT || — || align=right | 1.9 km || 
|-id=177 bgcolor=#fefefe
| 344177 ||  || — || January 18, 2001 || Socorro || LINEAR || H || align=right data-sort-value="0.85" | 850 m || 
|-id=178 bgcolor=#E9E9E9
| 344178 ||  || — || February 1, 2001 || Socorro || LINEAR || — || align=right | 1.2 km || 
|-id=179 bgcolor=#E9E9E9
| 344179 ||  || — || February 18, 2001 || Eskridge || Farpoint Obs. || — || align=right | 1.5 km || 
|-id=180 bgcolor=#E9E9E9
| 344180 ||  || — || February 16, 2001 || Socorro || LINEAR || — || align=right | 2.0 km || 
|-id=181 bgcolor=#E9E9E9
| 344181 ||  || — || February 16, 2001 || Socorro || LINEAR || — || align=right | 1.4 km || 
|-id=182 bgcolor=#E9E9E9
| 344182 ||  || — || February 17, 2001 || Socorro || LINEAR || JUN || align=right | 1.3 km || 
|-id=183 bgcolor=#E9E9E9
| 344183 ||  || — || February 17, 2001 || Haleakala || NEAT || — || align=right | 1.6 km || 
|-id=184 bgcolor=#FA8072
| 344184 ||  || — || February 16, 2001 || Anderson Mesa || LONEOS || — || align=right | 1.9 km || 
|-id=185 bgcolor=#C2FFFF
| 344185 ||  || — || February 20, 2001 || Socorro || LINEAR || L4 || align=right | 13 km || 
|-id=186 bgcolor=#E9E9E9
| 344186 ||  || — || March 16, 2001 || Socorro || LINEAR || — || align=right | 1.6 km || 
|-id=187 bgcolor=#E9E9E9
| 344187 ||  || — || March 21, 2001 || Kitt Peak || SKADS || — || align=right | 1.7 km || 
|-id=188 bgcolor=#fefefe
| 344188 ||  || — || April 15, 2001 || Socorro || LINEAR || — || align=right data-sort-value="0.98" | 980 m || 
|-id=189 bgcolor=#E9E9E9
| 344189 ||  || — || April 24, 2001 || Kitt Peak || Spacewatch || — || align=right | 3.1 km || 
|-id=190 bgcolor=#fefefe
| 344190 ||  || — || May 15, 2001 || Anderson Mesa || LONEOS || — || align=right | 1.00 km || 
|-id=191 bgcolor=#FA8072
| 344191 ||  || — || May 20, 2001 || Ondřejov || P. Pravec, P. Kušnirák || — || align=right data-sort-value="0.93" | 930 m || 
|-id=192 bgcolor=#fefefe
| 344192 ||  || — || June 15, 2001 || Socorro || LINEAR || — || align=right | 1.0 km || 
|-id=193 bgcolor=#fefefe
| 344193 ||  || — || July 13, 2001 || Palomar || NEAT || — || align=right data-sort-value="0.87" | 870 m || 
|-id=194 bgcolor=#fefefe
| 344194 ||  || — || July 19, 2001 || Palomar || NEAT || H || align=right | 1.0 km || 
|-id=195 bgcolor=#fefefe
| 344195 ||  || — || July 18, 2001 || Palomar || NEAT || — || align=right data-sort-value="0.85" | 850 m || 
|-id=196 bgcolor=#fefefe
| 344196 ||  || — || July 19, 2001 || Palomar || NEAT || — || align=right | 1.0 km || 
|-id=197 bgcolor=#E9E9E9
| 344197 ||  || — || January 13, 1999 || Kitt Peak || Spacewatch || KON || align=right | 3.4 km || 
|-id=198 bgcolor=#d6d6d6
| 344198 ||  || — || August 10, 2001 || Palomar || NEAT || EOS || align=right | 2.3 km || 
|-id=199 bgcolor=#fefefe
| 344199 ||  || — || August 11, 2001 || Palomar || NEAT || — || align=right | 1.1 km || 
|-id=200 bgcolor=#fefefe
| 344200 ||  || — || August 16, 2001 || Socorro || LINEAR || NYS || align=right data-sort-value="0.73" | 730 m || 
|}

344201–344300 

|-bgcolor=#fefefe
| 344201 ||  || — || August 22, 2001 || Socorro || LINEAR || H || align=right data-sort-value="0.98" | 980 m || 
|-id=202 bgcolor=#FA8072
| 344202 ||  || — || July 30, 2001 || Socorro || LINEAR || — || align=right | 1.1 km || 
|-id=203 bgcolor=#fefefe
| 344203 ||  || — || August 19, 2001 || Socorro || LINEAR || NYS || align=right data-sort-value="0.68" | 680 m || 
|-id=204 bgcolor=#d6d6d6
| 344204 ||  || — || August 22, 2001 || Haleakala || NEAT || — || align=right | 4.5 km || 
|-id=205 bgcolor=#fefefe
| 344205 ||  || — || August 25, 2001 || Palomar || NEAT || ERI || align=right | 2.3 km || 
|-id=206 bgcolor=#d6d6d6
| 344206 ||  || — || August 23, 2001 || Anderson Mesa || LONEOS || LIX || align=right | 3.8 km || 
|-id=207 bgcolor=#d6d6d6
| 344207 ||  || — || August 26, 2001 || Kitt Peak || Spacewatch || — || align=right | 2.3 km || 
|-id=208 bgcolor=#fefefe
| 344208 ||  || — || August 25, 2001 || Socorro || LINEAR || NYS || align=right data-sort-value="0.63" | 630 m || 
|-id=209 bgcolor=#d6d6d6
| 344209 ||  || — || August 20, 2001 || Palomar || NEAT || — || align=right | 4.4 km || 
|-id=210 bgcolor=#d6d6d6
| 344210 ||  || — || August 16, 2001 || Palomar || NEAT || — || align=right | 3.7 km || 
|-id=211 bgcolor=#fefefe
| 344211 ||  || — || August 17, 2001 || Socorro || LINEAR || V || align=right data-sort-value="0.66" | 660 m || 
|-id=212 bgcolor=#fefefe
| 344212 ||  || — || September 8, 2001 || Socorro || LINEAR || H || align=right | 1.0 km || 
|-id=213 bgcolor=#d6d6d6
| 344213 ||  || — || September 6, 2001 || Palomar || NEAT || — || align=right | 3.1 km || 
|-id=214 bgcolor=#fefefe
| 344214 ||  || — || August 20, 2001 || Socorro || LINEAR || — || align=right | 1.0 km || 
|-id=215 bgcolor=#fefefe
| 344215 ||  || — || September 6, 2001 || Palomar || NEAT || — || align=right | 1.1 km || 
|-id=216 bgcolor=#fefefe
| 344216 ||  || — || September 12, 2001 || Socorro || LINEAR || — || align=right | 1.1 km || 
|-id=217 bgcolor=#fefefe
| 344217 ||  || — || September 12, 2001 || Socorro || LINEAR || — || align=right data-sort-value="0.88" | 880 m || 
|-id=218 bgcolor=#fefefe
| 344218 ||  || — || September 10, 2001 || Socorro || LINEAR || — || align=right data-sort-value="0.91" | 910 m || 
|-id=219 bgcolor=#fefefe
| 344219 ||  || — || September 10, 2001 || Socorro || LINEAR || NYS || align=right data-sort-value="0.82" | 820 m || 
|-id=220 bgcolor=#fefefe
| 344220 ||  || — || September 11, 2001 || Anderson Mesa || LONEOS || — || align=right data-sort-value="0.92" | 920 m || 
|-id=221 bgcolor=#fefefe
| 344221 ||  || — || September 11, 2001 || Anderson Mesa || LONEOS || NYS || align=right data-sort-value="0.76" | 760 m || 
|-id=222 bgcolor=#d6d6d6
| 344222 ||  || — || September 12, 2001 || Socorro || LINEAR || — || align=right | 2.7 km || 
|-id=223 bgcolor=#fefefe
| 344223 ||  || — || September 12, 2001 || Socorro || LINEAR || — || align=right data-sort-value="0.89" | 890 m || 
|-id=224 bgcolor=#fefefe
| 344224 ||  || — || September 12, 2001 || Socorro || LINEAR || MAS || align=right data-sort-value="0.66" | 660 m || 
|-id=225 bgcolor=#d6d6d6
| 344225 ||  || — || September 12, 2001 || Socorro || LINEAR || — || align=right | 2.9 km || 
|-id=226 bgcolor=#d6d6d6
| 344226 ||  || — || September 12, 2001 || Socorro || LINEAR || — || align=right | 3.3 km || 
|-id=227 bgcolor=#d6d6d6
| 344227 ||  || — || September 8, 2001 || Socorro || LINEAR || — || align=right | 3.7 km || 
|-id=228 bgcolor=#fefefe
| 344228 ||  || — || September 11, 2001 || Anderson Mesa || LONEOS || — || align=right | 2.6 km || 
|-id=229 bgcolor=#fefefe
| 344229 || 2001 SC || — || September 16, 2001 || Emerald Lane || L. Ball || V || align=right data-sort-value="0.95" | 950 m || 
|-id=230 bgcolor=#d6d6d6
| 344230 ||  || — || September 16, 2001 || Socorro || LINEAR || EUP || align=right | 5.6 km || 
|-id=231 bgcolor=#fefefe
| 344231 ||  || — || September 16, 2001 || Socorro || LINEAR || MAS || align=right data-sort-value="0.87" | 870 m || 
|-id=232 bgcolor=#fefefe
| 344232 ||  || — || September 16, 2001 || Socorro || LINEAR || MAS || align=right data-sort-value="0.75" | 750 m || 
|-id=233 bgcolor=#d6d6d6
| 344233 ||  || — || September 16, 2001 || Socorro || LINEAR || — || align=right | 3.1 km || 
|-id=234 bgcolor=#d6d6d6
| 344234 ||  || — || September 16, 2001 || Socorro || LINEAR || — || align=right | 3.4 km || 
|-id=235 bgcolor=#fefefe
| 344235 ||  || — || September 16, 2001 || Socorro || LINEAR || ERI || align=right | 1.7 km || 
|-id=236 bgcolor=#FA8072
| 344236 ||  || — || August 22, 2001 || Kitt Peak || Spacewatch || — || align=right data-sort-value="0.62" | 620 m || 
|-id=237 bgcolor=#fefefe
| 344237 ||  || — || September 16, 2001 || Socorro || LINEAR || — || align=right | 1.0 km || 
|-id=238 bgcolor=#d6d6d6
| 344238 ||  || — || September 16, 2001 || Socorro || LINEAR || — || align=right | 3.1 km || 
|-id=239 bgcolor=#fefefe
| 344239 ||  || — || September 16, 2001 || Socorro || LINEAR || NYS || align=right data-sort-value="0.66" | 660 m || 
|-id=240 bgcolor=#d6d6d6
| 344240 ||  || — || September 16, 2001 || Socorro || LINEAR || — || align=right | 3.4 km || 
|-id=241 bgcolor=#d6d6d6
| 344241 ||  || — || September 16, 2001 || Socorro || LINEAR || — || align=right | 3.6 km || 
|-id=242 bgcolor=#fefefe
| 344242 ||  || — || September 16, 2001 || Socorro || LINEAR || — || align=right data-sort-value="0.82" | 820 m || 
|-id=243 bgcolor=#fefefe
| 344243 ||  || — || September 17, 2001 || Socorro || LINEAR || — || align=right data-sort-value="0.85" | 850 m || 
|-id=244 bgcolor=#fefefe
| 344244 ||  || — || September 17, 2001 || Socorro || LINEAR || — || align=right data-sort-value="0.92" | 920 m || 
|-id=245 bgcolor=#d6d6d6
| 344245 ||  || — || September 17, 2001 || Socorro || LINEAR || — || align=right | 3.6 km || 
|-id=246 bgcolor=#fefefe
| 344246 ||  || — || September 17, 2001 || Socorro || LINEAR || V || align=right data-sort-value="0.77" | 770 m || 
|-id=247 bgcolor=#d6d6d6
| 344247 ||  || — || September 17, 2001 || Socorro || LINEAR || EUP || align=right | 6.0 km || 
|-id=248 bgcolor=#fefefe
| 344248 ||  || — || September 19, 2001 || Socorro || LINEAR || MAS || align=right data-sort-value="0.71" | 710 m || 
|-id=249 bgcolor=#d6d6d6
| 344249 ||  || — || September 19, 2001 || Socorro || LINEAR || — || align=right | 3.5 km || 
|-id=250 bgcolor=#fefefe
| 344250 ||  || — || September 19, 2001 || Socorro || LINEAR || V || align=right data-sort-value="0.67" | 670 m || 
|-id=251 bgcolor=#d6d6d6
| 344251 ||  || — || September 19, 2001 || Socorro || LINEAR || THM || align=right | 2.7 km || 
|-id=252 bgcolor=#fefefe
| 344252 ||  || — || September 19, 2001 || Socorro || LINEAR || ERI || align=right | 1.5 km || 
|-id=253 bgcolor=#fefefe
| 344253 ||  || — || September 19, 2001 || Socorro || LINEAR || NYS || align=right data-sort-value="0.82" | 820 m || 
|-id=254 bgcolor=#fefefe
| 344254 ||  || — || September 19, 2001 || Socorro || LINEAR || V || align=right data-sort-value="0.84" | 840 m || 
|-id=255 bgcolor=#fefefe
| 344255 ||  || — || August 26, 2001 || Socorro || LINEAR || H || align=right data-sort-value="0.66" | 660 m || 
|-id=256 bgcolor=#d6d6d6
| 344256 ||  || — || September 20, 2001 || Kitt Peak || Spacewatch || THM || align=right | 2.4 km || 
|-id=257 bgcolor=#fefefe
| 344257 ||  || — || September 29, 2001 || Palomar || NEAT || — || align=right | 2.4 km || 
|-id=258 bgcolor=#fefefe
| 344258 ||  || — || September 20, 2001 || Socorro || LINEAR || ERI || align=right | 1.6 km || 
|-id=259 bgcolor=#d6d6d6
| 344259 ||  || — || September 12, 2001 || Kitt Peak || Spacewatch || — || align=right | 3.1 km || 
|-id=260 bgcolor=#d6d6d6
| 344260 ||  || — || September 20, 2001 || Socorro || LINEAR || — || align=right | 3.1 km || 
|-id=261 bgcolor=#d6d6d6
| 344261 ||  || — || September 19, 2001 || Socorro || LINEAR || TEL || align=right | 1.9 km || 
|-id=262 bgcolor=#d6d6d6
| 344262 ||  || — || September 21, 2001 || Socorro || LINEAR || THB || align=right | 3.9 km || 
|-id=263 bgcolor=#d6d6d6
| 344263 ||  || — || September 25, 2001 || Socorro || LINEAR || — || align=right | 3.5 km || 
|-id=264 bgcolor=#d6d6d6
| 344264 ||  || — || September 19, 2001 || Socorro || LINEAR || EOS || align=right | 1.9 km || 
|-id=265 bgcolor=#fefefe
| 344265 ||  || — || September 20, 2001 || Socorro || LINEAR || — || align=right data-sort-value="0.94" | 940 m || 
|-id=266 bgcolor=#fefefe
| 344266 ||  || — || September 22, 2001 || Palomar || NEAT || LCI || align=right | 1.3 km || 
|-id=267 bgcolor=#d6d6d6
| 344267 ||  || — || September 21, 2001 || Socorro || LINEAR || EUP || align=right | 3.3 km || 
|-id=268 bgcolor=#d6d6d6
| 344268 ||  || — || September 19, 2001 || Anderson Mesa || LONEOS || — || align=right | 3.6 km || 
|-id=269 bgcolor=#d6d6d6
| 344269 ||  || — || September 24, 2001 || Palomar || NEAT || — || align=right | 3.2 km || 
|-id=270 bgcolor=#fefefe
| 344270 ||  || — || September 18, 2001 || Anderson Mesa || LONEOS || — || align=right data-sort-value="0.95" | 950 m || 
|-id=271 bgcolor=#d6d6d6
| 344271 ||  || — || October 8, 2001 || Socorro || LINEAR || TIR || align=right | 3.1 km || 
|-id=272 bgcolor=#fefefe
| 344272 ||  || — || October 14, 2001 || Needville || Needville Obs. || V || align=right data-sort-value="0.76" | 760 m || 
|-id=273 bgcolor=#d6d6d6
| 344273 ||  || — || October 9, 2001 || Kitt Peak || Spacewatch || HYG || align=right | 2.7 km || 
|-id=274 bgcolor=#d6d6d6
| 344274 ||  || — || October 13, 2001 || Socorro || LINEAR || — || align=right | 3.5 km || 
|-id=275 bgcolor=#fefefe
| 344275 ||  || — || October 13, 2001 || Socorro || LINEAR || NYS || align=right data-sort-value="0.76" | 760 m || 
|-id=276 bgcolor=#fefefe
| 344276 ||  || — || October 10, 2001 || Palomar || NEAT || — || align=right data-sort-value="0.87" | 870 m || 
|-id=277 bgcolor=#fefefe
| 344277 ||  || — || October 10, 2001 || Palomar || NEAT || — || align=right | 1.0 km || 
|-id=278 bgcolor=#d6d6d6
| 344278 ||  || — || September 16, 2001 || Socorro || LINEAR || EMA || align=right | 4.0 km || 
|-id=279 bgcolor=#fefefe
| 344279 ||  || — || October 15, 2001 || Socorro || LINEAR || — || align=right | 1.8 km || 
|-id=280 bgcolor=#d6d6d6
| 344280 ||  || — || October 15, 2001 || Socorro || LINEAR || — || align=right | 3.8 km || 
|-id=281 bgcolor=#d6d6d6
| 344281 ||  || — || October 14, 2001 || Socorro || LINEAR || — || align=right | 3.3 km || 
|-id=282 bgcolor=#fefefe
| 344282 ||  || — || October 14, 2001 || Socorro || LINEAR || NYS || align=right data-sort-value="0.67" | 670 m || 
|-id=283 bgcolor=#d6d6d6
| 344283 ||  || — || October 7, 2001 || Palomar || NEAT || — || align=right | 3.8 km || 
|-id=284 bgcolor=#fefefe
| 344284 ||  || — || October 14, 2001 || Socorro || LINEAR || — || align=right data-sort-value="0.86" | 860 m || 
|-id=285 bgcolor=#fefefe
| 344285 ||  || — || October 11, 2001 || Socorro || LINEAR || — || align=right | 1.1 km || 
|-id=286 bgcolor=#d6d6d6
| 344286 ||  || — || September 22, 2001 || Anderson Mesa || LONEOS || — || align=right | 3.1 km || 
|-id=287 bgcolor=#d6d6d6
| 344287 ||  || — || October 14, 2001 || Palomar || NEAT || — || align=right | 3.9 km || 
|-id=288 bgcolor=#d6d6d6
| 344288 ||  || — || October 14, 2001 || Apache Point || SDSS || — || align=right | 4.1 km || 
|-id=289 bgcolor=#d6d6d6
| 344289 ||  || — || October 14, 2001 || Apache Point || SDSS || — || align=right | 3.4 km || 
|-id=290 bgcolor=#fefefe
| 344290 ||  || — || October 15, 2001 || Palomar || NEAT || V || align=right data-sort-value="0.79" | 790 m || 
|-id=291 bgcolor=#fefefe
| 344291 ||  || — || October 21, 2001 || Emerald Lane || L. Ball || NYS || align=right data-sort-value="0.69" | 690 m || 
|-id=292 bgcolor=#fefefe
| 344292 ||  || — || October 24, 2001 || Desert Eagle || W. K. Y. Yeung || NYS || align=right data-sort-value="0.92" | 920 m || 
|-id=293 bgcolor=#fefefe
| 344293 ||  || — || October 18, 2001 || Socorro || LINEAR || V || align=right | 1.0 km || 
|-id=294 bgcolor=#d6d6d6
| 344294 ||  || — || October 17, 2001 || Socorro || LINEAR || — || align=right | 3.7 km || 
|-id=295 bgcolor=#fefefe
| 344295 ||  || — || October 18, 2001 || Socorro || LINEAR || V || align=right data-sort-value="0.82" | 820 m || 
|-id=296 bgcolor=#fefefe
| 344296 ||  || — || October 11, 2001 || Palomar || NEAT || NYS || align=right data-sort-value="0.60" | 600 m || 
|-id=297 bgcolor=#d6d6d6
| 344297 ||  || — || October 17, 2001 || Socorro || LINEAR || EOS || align=right | 2.7 km || 
|-id=298 bgcolor=#d6d6d6
| 344298 ||  || — || October 18, 2001 || Socorro || LINEAR || — || align=right | 4.7 km || 
|-id=299 bgcolor=#d6d6d6
| 344299 ||  || — || October 17, 2001 || Socorro || LINEAR || — || align=right | 3.1 km || 
|-id=300 bgcolor=#fefefe
| 344300 ||  || — || October 18, 2001 || Kitt Peak || Spacewatch || NYS || align=right data-sort-value="0.56" | 560 m || 
|}

344301–344400 

|-bgcolor=#fefefe
| 344301 ||  || — || October 21, 2001 || Kitt Peak || Spacewatch || — || align=right data-sort-value="0.65" | 650 m || 
|-id=302 bgcolor=#fefefe
| 344302 ||  || — || October 20, 2001 || Socorro || LINEAR || MAS || align=right data-sort-value="0.71" | 710 m || 
|-id=303 bgcolor=#d6d6d6
| 344303 ||  || — || October 21, 2001 || Socorro || LINEAR || — || align=right | 3.1 km || 
|-id=304 bgcolor=#d6d6d6
| 344304 ||  || — || October 22, 2001 || Socorro || LINEAR || — || align=right | 3.5 km || 
|-id=305 bgcolor=#d6d6d6
| 344305 ||  || — || October 20, 2001 || Socorro || LINEAR || — || align=right | 3.1 km || 
|-id=306 bgcolor=#fefefe
| 344306 ||  || — || October 18, 2001 || Palomar || NEAT || — || align=right data-sort-value="0.85" | 850 m || 
|-id=307 bgcolor=#d6d6d6
| 344307 ||  || — || October 20, 2001 || Socorro || LINEAR || THM || align=right | 2.5 km || 
|-id=308 bgcolor=#d6d6d6
| 344308 ||  || — || October 22, 2001 || Socorro || LINEAR || — || align=right | 4.0 km || 
|-id=309 bgcolor=#fefefe
| 344309 ||  || — || October 23, 2001 || Socorro || LINEAR || NYS || align=right data-sort-value="0.70" | 700 m || 
|-id=310 bgcolor=#fefefe
| 344310 ||  || — || October 23, 2001 || Socorro || LINEAR || MAS || align=right data-sort-value="0.68" | 680 m || 
|-id=311 bgcolor=#fefefe
| 344311 ||  || — || October 23, 2001 || Socorro || LINEAR || — || align=right | 1.2 km || 
|-id=312 bgcolor=#fefefe
| 344312 ||  || — || October 21, 2001 || Socorro || LINEAR || — || align=right data-sort-value="0.85" | 850 m || 
|-id=313 bgcolor=#d6d6d6
| 344313 ||  || — || October 11, 2001 || Palomar || NEAT || — || align=right | 4.0 km || 
|-id=314 bgcolor=#d6d6d6
| 344314 ||  || — || October 18, 2001 || Palomar || NEAT || — || align=right | 2.9 km || 
|-id=315 bgcolor=#d6d6d6
| 344315 ||  || — || October 14, 2001 || Socorro || LINEAR || — || align=right | 3.4 km || 
|-id=316 bgcolor=#d6d6d6
| 344316 ||  || — || October 19, 2001 || Palomar || NEAT || — || align=right | 3.1 km || 
|-id=317 bgcolor=#d6d6d6
| 344317 ||  || — || October 19, 2001 || Palomar || NEAT || EOS || align=right | 2.2 km || 
|-id=318 bgcolor=#d6d6d6
| 344318 ||  || — || October 19, 2001 || Palomar || NEAT || EMA || align=right | 4.1 km || 
|-id=319 bgcolor=#fefefe
| 344319 ||  || — || October 20, 2001 || Socorro || LINEAR || — || align=right | 1.1 km || 
|-id=320 bgcolor=#d6d6d6
| 344320 ||  || — || October 23, 2001 || Socorro || LINEAR || THM || align=right | 2.7 km || 
|-id=321 bgcolor=#fefefe
| 344321 ||  || — || October 23, 2001 || Socorro || LINEAR || — || align=right data-sort-value="0.94" | 940 m || 
|-id=322 bgcolor=#d6d6d6
| 344322 ||  || — || October 23, 2001 || Kitt Peak || Spacewatch || — || align=right | 3.4 km || 
|-id=323 bgcolor=#fefefe
| 344323 ||  || — || October 25, 2001 || Socorro || LINEAR || — || align=right | 1.5 km || 
|-id=324 bgcolor=#d6d6d6
| 344324 ||  || — || October 25, 2001 || Socorro || LINEAR || MEL || align=right | 4.8 km || 
|-id=325 bgcolor=#d6d6d6
| 344325 ||  || — || November 9, 2001 || Socorro || LINEAR || URS || align=right | 4.5 km || 
|-id=326 bgcolor=#fefefe
| 344326 ||  || — || November 10, 2001 || Socorro || LINEAR || ERI || align=right | 1.8 km || 
|-id=327 bgcolor=#fefefe
| 344327 ||  || — || November 9, 2001 || Socorro || LINEAR || V || align=right data-sort-value="0.89" | 890 m || 
|-id=328 bgcolor=#fefefe
| 344328 ||  || — || November 9, 2001 || Socorro || LINEAR || — || align=right | 1.2 km || 
|-id=329 bgcolor=#d6d6d6
| 344329 ||  || — || November 9, 2001 || Socorro || LINEAR || — || align=right | 4.8 km || 
|-id=330 bgcolor=#d6d6d6
| 344330 ||  || — || November 12, 2001 || Kitt Peak || Spacewatch || 637 || align=right | 2.6 km || 
|-id=331 bgcolor=#fefefe
| 344331 ||  || — || November 12, 2001 || Kitt Peak || Spacewatch || MAS || align=right data-sort-value="0.65" | 650 m || 
|-id=332 bgcolor=#FA8072
| 344332 ||  || — || November 12, 2001 || Socorro || LINEAR || — || align=right | 2.0 km || 
|-id=333 bgcolor=#fefefe
| 344333 ||  || — || November 12, 2001 || Socorro || LINEAR || V || align=right data-sort-value="0.71" | 710 m || 
|-id=334 bgcolor=#d6d6d6
| 344334 ||  || — || November 15, 2001 || Socorro || LINEAR || — || align=right | 4.4 km || 
|-id=335 bgcolor=#d6d6d6
| 344335 ||  || — || November 15, 2001 || Socorro || LINEAR || THB || align=right | 3.6 km || 
|-id=336 bgcolor=#d6d6d6
| 344336 ||  || — || November 15, 2001 || Socorro || LINEAR || Tj (2.98) || align=right | 5.2 km || 
|-id=337 bgcolor=#fefefe
| 344337 ||  || — || November 12, 2001 || Socorro || LINEAR || NYS || align=right data-sort-value="0.83" | 830 m || 
|-id=338 bgcolor=#d6d6d6
| 344338 ||  || — || November 12, 2001 || Socorro || LINEAR || TIR || align=right | 4.1 km || 
|-id=339 bgcolor=#d6d6d6
| 344339 ||  || — || November 11, 2001 || Apache Point || SDSS || — || align=right | 3.2 km || 
|-id=340 bgcolor=#C2FFFF
| 344340 ||  || — || November 12, 2001 || Apache Point || SDSS || L5 || align=right | 9.2 km || 
|-id=341 bgcolor=#d6d6d6
| 344341 ||  || — || November 17, 2001 || Socorro || LINEAR || — || align=right | 3.8 km || 
|-id=342 bgcolor=#FA8072
| 344342 ||  || — || November 26, 2001 || Socorro || LINEAR || PHO || align=right | 2.1 km || 
|-id=343 bgcolor=#fefefe
| 344343 ||  || — || November 17, 2001 || Socorro || LINEAR || MAS || align=right data-sort-value="0.75" | 750 m || 
|-id=344 bgcolor=#fefefe
| 344344 ||  || — || November 17, 2001 || Socorro || LINEAR || — || align=right | 1.3 km || 
|-id=345 bgcolor=#fefefe
| 344345 ||  || — || November 17, 2001 || Socorro || LINEAR || NYS || align=right data-sort-value="0.90" | 900 m || 
|-id=346 bgcolor=#fefefe
| 344346 ||  || — || November 17, 2001 || Socorro || LINEAR || V || align=right data-sort-value="0.84" | 840 m || 
|-id=347 bgcolor=#fefefe
| 344347 ||  || — || November 17, 2001 || Socorro || LINEAR || NYS || align=right data-sort-value="0.69" | 690 m || 
|-id=348 bgcolor=#d6d6d6
| 344348 ||  || — || November 19, 2001 || Anderson Mesa || LONEOS || — || align=right | 4.8 km || 
|-id=349 bgcolor=#d6d6d6
| 344349 ||  || — || November 19, 2001 || Socorro || LINEAR || — || align=right | 4.5 km || 
|-id=350 bgcolor=#fefefe
| 344350 ||  || — || October 19, 2001 || Palomar || NEAT || NYS || align=right data-sort-value="0.83" | 830 m || 
|-id=351 bgcolor=#d6d6d6
| 344351 ||  || — || November 19, 2001 || Socorro || LINEAR || HYG || align=right | 3.5 km || 
|-id=352 bgcolor=#d6d6d6
| 344352 ||  || — || November 20, 2001 || Socorro || LINEAR || — || align=right | 3.8 km || 
|-id=353 bgcolor=#d6d6d6
| 344353 ||  || — || October 13, 2001 || Kitt Peak || Spacewatch || — || align=right | 2.8 km || 
|-id=354 bgcolor=#fefefe
| 344354 ||  || — || November 20, 2001 || Socorro || LINEAR || MAS || align=right data-sort-value="0.71" | 710 m || 
|-id=355 bgcolor=#fefefe
| 344355 ||  || — || November 20, 2001 || Socorro || LINEAR || MAS || align=right data-sort-value="0.91" | 910 m || 
|-id=356 bgcolor=#d6d6d6
| 344356 ||  || — || November 20, 2001 || Socorro || LINEAR || THM || align=right | 2.3 km || 
|-id=357 bgcolor=#d6d6d6
| 344357 ||  || — || November 21, 2001 || Socorro || LINEAR || — || align=right | 3.4 km || 
|-id=358 bgcolor=#d6d6d6
| 344358 ||  || — || December 9, 2001 || Socorro || LINEAR || LIX || align=right | 4.8 km || 
|-id=359 bgcolor=#d6d6d6
| 344359 ||  || — || December 7, 2001 || Kitt Peak || Spacewatch || — || align=right | 3.2 km || 
|-id=360 bgcolor=#fefefe
| 344360 ||  || — || December 10, 2001 || Kitt Peak || Spacewatch || MAS || align=right data-sort-value="0.68" | 680 m || 
|-id=361 bgcolor=#d6d6d6
| 344361 ||  || — || December 9, 2001 || Socorro || LINEAR || TIR || align=right | 4.0 km || 
|-id=362 bgcolor=#fefefe
| 344362 ||  || — || December 11, 2001 || Socorro || LINEAR || — || align=right data-sort-value="0.96" | 960 m || 
|-id=363 bgcolor=#d6d6d6
| 344363 ||  || — || December 10, 2001 || Socorro || LINEAR || EUP || align=right | 4.9 km || 
|-id=364 bgcolor=#d6d6d6
| 344364 ||  || — || December 10, 2001 || Socorro || LINEAR || TIR || align=right | 6.0 km || 
|-id=365 bgcolor=#fefefe
| 344365 ||  || — || December 11, 2001 || Socorro || LINEAR || — || align=right | 1.1 km || 
|-id=366 bgcolor=#fefefe
| 344366 ||  || — || October 10, 2001 || Palomar || NEAT || V || align=right data-sort-value="0.78" | 780 m || 
|-id=367 bgcolor=#d6d6d6
| 344367 ||  || — || December 14, 2001 || Socorro || LINEAR || THM || align=right | 2.5 km || 
|-id=368 bgcolor=#d6d6d6
| 344368 ||  || — || December 14, 2001 || Socorro || LINEAR || THM || align=right | 2.8 km || 
|-id=369 bgcolor=#fefefe
| 344369 ||  || — || December 14, 2001 || Socorro || LINEAR || — || align=right data-sort-value="0.86" | 860 m || 
|-id=370 bgcolor=#fefefe
| 344370 ||  || — || December 14, 2001 || Socorro || LINEAR || NYS || align=right data-sort-value="0.73" | 730 m || 
|-id=371 bgcolor=#fefefe
| 344371 ||  || — || December 14, 2001 || Socorro || LINEAR || NYS || align=right data-sort-value="0.63" | 630 m || 
|-id=372 bgcolor=#fefefe
| 344372 ||  || — || December 14, 2001 || Socorro || LINEAR || V || align=right data-sort-value="0.83" | 830 m || 
|-id=373 bgcolor=#d6d6d6
| 344373 ||  || — || December 14, 2001 || Socorro || LINEAR || EOS || align=right | 3.1 km || 
|-id=374 bgcolor=#d6d6d6
| 344374 ||  || — || December 14, 2001 || Socorro || LINEAR || VER || align=right | 3.9 km || 
|-id=375 bgcolor=#fefefe
| 344375 ||  || — || December 14, 2001 || Socorro || LINEAR || NYS || align=right data-sort-value="0.86" | 860 m || 
|-id=376 bgcolor=#d6d6d6
| 344376 ||  || — || December 13, 2001 || Bergisch Gladbach || W. Bickel || — || align=right | 3.8 km || 
|-id=377 bgcolor=#fefefe
| 344377 ||  || — || December 11, 2001 || Socorro || LINEAR || — || align=right | 1.1 km || 
|-id=378 bgcolor=#fefefe
| 344378 ||  || — || December 11, 2001 || Socorro || LINEAR || ERI || align=right | 1.7 km || 
|-id=379 bgcolor=#fefefe
| 344379 ||  || — || December 11, 2001 || Socorro || LINEAR || — || align=right | 1.1 km || 
|-id=380 bgcolor=#d6d6d6
| 344380 ||  || — || December 11, 2001 || Socorro || LINEAR || EUP || align=right | 5.6 km || 
|-id=381 bgcolor=#d6d6d6
| 344381 ||  || — || December 14, 2001 || Socorro || LINEAR || — || align=right | 4.4 km || 
|-id=382 bgcolor=#d6d6d6
| 344382 ||  || — || December 15, 2001 || Socorro || LINEAR || — || align=right | 3.7 km || 
|-id=383 bgcolor=#d6d6d6
| 344383 ||  || — || December 15, 2001 || Socorro || LINEAR || — || align=right | 4.1 km || 
|-id=384 bgcolor=#d6d6d6
| 344384 ||  || — || December 15, 2001 || Socorro || LINEAR || — || align=right | 3.8 km || 
|-id=385 bgcolor=#d6d6d6
| 344385 ||  || — || December 15, 2001 || Socorro || LINEAR || — || align=right | 4.5 km || 
|-id=386 bgcolor=#d6d6d6
| 344386 ||  || — || December 15, 2001 || Socorro || LINEAR || ALA || align=right | 5.8 km || 
|-id=387 bgcolor=#fefefe
| 344387 ||  || — || December 14, 2001 || Kitt Peak || Spacewatch || MAS || align=right data-sort-value="0.65" | 650 m || 
|-id=388 bgcolor=#d6d6d6
| 344388 ||  || — || December 8, 2001 || Anderson Mesa || LONEOS || — || align=right | 3.8 km || 
|-id=389 bgcolor=#d6d6d6
| 344389 ||  || — || December 10, 2001 || Kitt Peak || Spacewatch || — || align=right | 2.6 km || 
|-id=390 bgcolor=#d6d6d6
| 344390 ||  || — || December 9, 2001 || Socorro || LINEAR || — || align=right | 3.9 km || 
|-id=391 bgcolor=#d6d6d6
| 344391 ||  || — || December 18, 2001 || Socorro || LINEAR || URS || align=right | 4.2 km || 
|-id=392 bgcolor=#d6d6d6
| 344392 ||  || — || December 18, 2001 || Socorro || LINEAR || — || align=right | 6.0 km || 
|-id=393 bgcolor=#fefefe
| 344393 ||  || — || December 18, 2001 || Socorro || LINEAR || — || align=right | 1.3 km || 
|-id=394 bgcolor=#d6d6d6
| 344394 ||  || — || December 18, 2001 || Socorro || LINEAR || — || align=right | 4.8 km || 
|-id=395 bgcolor=#fefefe
| 344395 ||  || — || December 18, 2001 || Socorro || LINEAR || — || align=right | 1.0 km || 
|-id=396 bgcolor=#d6d6d6
| 344396 ||  || — || December 17, 2001 || Socorro || LINEAR || — || align=right | 4.7 km || 
|-id=397 bgcolor=#fefefe
| 344397 ||  || — || December 17, 2001 || Socorro || LINEAR || — || align=right | 1.1 km || 
|-id=398 bgcolor=#d6d6d6
| 344398 ||  || — || December 17, 2001 || Socorro || LINEAR || — || align=right | 4.8 km || 
|-id=399 bgcolor=#d6d6d6
| 344399 ||  || — || January 8, 2002 || Socorro || LINEAR || Tj (2.95) || align=right | 3.3 km || 
|-id=400 bgcolor=#E9E9E9
| 344400 ||  || — || January 9, 2002 || Cima Ekar || ADAS || EUN || align=right | 1.8 km || 
|}

344401–344500 

|-bgcolor=#E9E9E9
| 344401 ||  || — || January 9, 2002 || Kitt Peak || Spacewatch || EUN || align=right | 1.7 km || 
|-id=402 bgcolor=#fefefe
| 344402 ||  || — || January 8, 2002 || Palomar || NEAT || V || align=right | 1.1 km || 
|-id=403 bgcolor=#fefefe
| 344403 ||  || — || January 7, 2002 || Kitt Peak || Spacewatch || — || align=right | 1.00 km || 
|-id=404 bgcolor=#d6d6d6
| 344404 ||  || — || January 9, 2002 || Socorro || LINEAR || — || align=right | 3.5 km || 
|-id=405 bgcolor=#d6d6d6
| 344405 ||  || — || January 9, 2002 || Socorro || LINEAR || ALA || align=right | 5.2 km || 
|-id=406 bgcolor=#fefefe
| 344406 ||  || — || January 9, 2002 || Socorro || LINEAR || MAS || align=right | 1.0 km || 
|-id=407 bgcolor=#fefefe
| 344407 ||  || — || January 13, 2002 || Socorro || LINEAR || NYS || align=right data-sort-value="0.89" | 890 m || 
|-id=408 bgcolor=#d6d6d6
| 344408 ||  || — || January 9, 2002 || Socorro || LINEAR || HYG || align=right | 3.3 km || 
|-id=409 bgcolor=#d6d6d6
| 344409 ||  || — || January 13, 2002 || Palomar || NEAT || — || align=right | 4.4 km || 
|-id=410 bgcolor=#E9E9E9
| 344410 ||  || — || January 13, 2002 || Palomar || NEAT || HNS || align=right | 1.5 km || 
|-id=411 bgcolor=#fefefe
| 344411 ||  || — || January 13, 2002 || Socorro || LINEAR || — || align=right | 1.1 km || 
|-id=412 bgcolor=#E9E9E9
| 344412 ||  || — || January 14, 2002 || Socorro || LINEAR || — || align=right | 1.2 km || 
|-id=413 bgcolor=#d6d6d6
| 344413 Campodeifiori || 2002 BC ||  || January 18, 2002 || Schiaparelli || F. Bellini || — || align=right | 4.1 km || 
|-id=414 bgcolor=#fefefe
| 344414 ||  || — || January 19, 2002 || Socorro || LINEAR || — || align=right data-sort-value="0.87" | 870 m || 
|-id=415 bgcolor=#d6d6d6
| 344415 ||  || — || January 19, 2002 || Anderson Mesa || LONEOS || — || align=right | 5.1 km || 
|-id=416 bgcolor=#fefefe
| 344416 ||  || — || January 26, 2002 || Socorro || LINEAR || — || align=right | 1.2 km || 
|-id=417 bgcolor=#fefefe
| 344417 ||  || — || February 6, 2002 || Socorro || LINEAR || NYS || align=right data-sort-value="0.84" | 840 m || 
|-id=418 bgcolor=#d6d6d6
| 344418 ||  || — || February 7, 2002 || Socorro || LINEAR || — || align=right | 2.8 km || 
|-id=419 bgcolor=#d6d6d6
| 344419 ||  || — || February 7, 2002 || Socorro || LINEAR || — || align=right | 4.7 km || 
|-id=420 bgcolor=#d6d6d6
| 344420 ||  || — || February 7, 2002 || Socorro || LINEAR || — || align=right | 3.0 km || 
|-id=421 bgcolor=#fefefe
| 344421 ||  || — || February 10, 2002 || Socorro || LINEAR || — || align=right data-sort-value="0.96" | 960 m || 
|-id=422 bgcolor=#fefefe
| 344422 ||  || — || February 10, 2002 || Socorro || LINEAR || — || align=right | 1.2 km || 
|-id=423 bgcolor=#fefefe
| 344423 ||  || — || February 10, 2002 || Socorro || LINEAR || NYS || align=right data-sort-value="0.99" | 990 m || 
|-id=424 bgcolor=#E9E9E9
| 344424 ||  || — || February 11, 2002 || Socorro || LINEAR || — || align=right | 1.4 km || 
|-id=425 bgcolor=#d6d6d6
| 344425 ||  || — || February 12, 2002 || Palomar || NEAT || Tj (2.95) || align=right | 3.2 km || 
|-id=426 bgcolor=#d6d6d6
| 344426 ||  || — || February 6, 2002 || Palomar || NEAT || — || align=right | 5.0 km || 
|-id=427 bgcolor=#fefefe
| 344427 ||  || — || February 9, 2002 || Kitt Peak || Spacewatch || MAS || align=right data-sort-value="0.66" | 660 m || 
|-id=428 bgcolor=#fefefe
| 344428 ||  || — || February 16, 2002 || Ondřejov || P. Pravec, P. Kušnirák || MAS || align=right data-sort-value="0.80" | 800 m || 
|-id=429 bgcolor=#E9E9E9
| 344429 ||  || — || March 12, 2002 || Socorro || LINEAR || — || align=right | 1.2 km || 
|-id=430 bgcolor=#E9E9E9
| 344430 ||  || — || March 5, 2002 || Haleakala || NEAT || — || align=right | 2.2 km || 
|-id=431 bgcolor=#E9E9E9
| 344431 ||  || — || March 10, 2002 || Kitt Peak || Spacewatch || — || align=right | 1.4 km || 
|-id=432 bgcolor=#fefefe
| 344432 ||  || — || March 10, 2002 || Haleakala || NEAT || — || align=right | 1.1 km || 
|-id=433 bgcolor=#E9E9E9
| 344433 ||  || — || March 13, 2002 || Palomar || NEAT || — || align=right data-sort-value="0.99" | 990 m || 
|-id=434 bgcolor=#E9E9E9
| 344434 ||  || — || March 31, 2002 || Palomar || NEAT || MAR || align=right | 1.5 km || 
|-id=435 bgcolor=#C2FFFF
| 344435 ||  || — || March 30, 2002 || Palomar || NEAT || L4 || align=right | 16 km || 
|-id=436 bgcolor=#E9E9E9
| 344436 ||  || — || April 15, 2002 || Desert Eagle || W. K. Y. Yeung || — || align=right | 2.8 km || 
|-id=437 bgcolor=#E9E9E9
| 344437 ||  || — || April 10, 2002 || Socorro || LINEAR || — || align=right | 1.7 km || 
|-id=438 bgcolor=#E9E9E9
| 344438 ||  || — || April 11, 2002 || Socorro || LINEAR || — || align=right | 1.0 km || 
|-id=439 bgcolor=#E9E9E9
| 344439 ||  || — || April 11, 2002 || Socorro || LINEAR || — || align=right | 1.2 km || 
|-id=440 bgcolor=#E9E9E9
| 344440 ||  || — || April 12, 2002 || Palomar || NEAT || — || align=right | 1.1 km || 
|-id=441 bgcolor=#E9E9E9
| 344441 ||  || — || April 9, 2002 || Socorro || LINEAR || — || align=right | 2.5 km || 
|-id=442 bgcolor=#E9E9E9
| 344442 ||  || — || April 2, 2002 || Kitt Peak || Spacewatch || — || align=right | 1.8 km || 
|-id=443 bgcolor=#E9E9E9
| 344443 ||  || — || April 8, 2002 || Palomar || NEAT || — || align=right | 1.3 km || 
|-id=444 bgcolor=#E9E9E9
| 344444 ||  || — || April 16, 2002 || Socorro || LINEAR || — || align=right | 2.7 km || 
|-id=445 bgcolor=#E9E9E9
| 344445 ||  || — || April 19, 2002 || Kitt Peak || Spacewatch || — || align=right | 1.8 km || 
|-id=446 bgcolor=#E9E9E9
| 344446 ||  || — || May 9, 2002 || Socorro || LINEAR || — || align=right | 3.4 km || 
|-id=447 bgcolor=#E9E9E9
| 344447 ||  || — || May 11, 2002 || Socorro || LINEAR || — || align=right | 1.1 km || 
|-id=448 bgcolor=#E9E9E9
| 344448 ||  || — || May 11, 2002 || Socorro || LINEAR || — || align=right | 2.1 km || 
|-id=449 bgcolor=#E9E9E9
| 344449 ||  || — || May 13, 2002 || Socorro || LINEAR || — || align=right | 1.8 km || 
|-id=450 bgcolor=#E9E9E9
| 344450 ||  || — || May 5, 2002 || Palomar || NEAT || EUN || align=right | 1.6 km || 
|-id=451 bgcolor=#E9E9E9
| 344451 ||  || — || May 6, 2002 || Palomar || NEAT || — || align=right | 2.1 km || 
|-id=452 bgcolor=#E9E9E9
| 344452 ||  || — || May 18, 2002 || Palomar || NEAT || — || align=right | 1.6 km || 
|-id=453 bgcolor=#E9E9E9
| 344453 ||  || — || June 9, 2002 || Socorro || LINEAR || TIN || align=right | 3.1 km || 
|-id=454 bgcolor=#E9E9E9
| 344454 ||  || — || June 10, 2002 || Socorro || LINEAR || — || align=right | 2.0 km || 
|-id=455 bgcolor=#E9E9E9
| 344455 ||  || — || June 15, 2002 || Emerald Lane || L. Ball || ADE || align=right | 3.4 km || 
|-id=456 bgcolor=#E9E9E9
| 344456 ||  || — || June 9, 2002 || Socorro || LINEAR || — || align=right | 1.9 km || 
|-id=457 bgcolor=#E9E9E9
| 344457 ||  || — || June 24, 2002 || Palomar || NEAT || — || align=right | 4.4 km || 
|-id=458 bgcolor=#E9E9E9
| 344458 ||  || — || April 25, 2006 || Mount Lemmon || Mount Lemmon Survey || — || align=right | 2.1 km || 
|-id=459 bgcolor=#fefefe
| 344459 ||  || — || January 14, 2008 || Kitt Peak || Spacewatch || — || align=right data-sort-value="0.80" | 800 m || 
|-id=460 bgcolor=#fefefe
| 344460 ||  || — || July 9, 2002 || Socorro || LINEAR || — || align=right data-sort-value="0.73" | 730 m || 
|-id=461 bgcolor=#E9E9E9
| 344461 ||  || — || July 11, 2002 || Campo Imperatore || CINEOS || GEF || align=right | 1.6 km || 
|-id=462 bgcolor=#E9E9E9
| 344462 ||  || — || July 9, 2002 || Palomar || NEAT || NEM || align=right | 2.4 km || 
|-id=463 bgcolor=#E9E9E9
| 344463 ||  || — || July 9, 2002 || Palomar || NEAT || — || align=right | 2.0 km || 
|-id=464 bgcolor=#E9E9E9
| 344464 ||  || — || November 30, 2003 || Kitt Peak || Spacewatch || WIT || align=right | 1.1 km || 
|-id=465 bgcolor=#E9E9E9
| 344465 ||  || — || May 8, 2006 || Mount Lemmon || Mount Lemmon Survey || GEF || align=right | 1.3 km || 
|-id=466 bgcolor=#E9E9E9
| 344466 ||  || — || July 20, 2002 || Palomar || NEAT || — || align=right | 2.2 km || 
|-id=467 bgcolor=#E9E9E9
| 344467 ||  || — || July 20, 2002 || Palomar || NEAT || — || align=right | 3.2 km || 
|-id=468 bgcolor=#E9E9E9
| 344468 ||  || — || April 26, 2006 || Mount Lemmon || Mount Lemmon Survey || — || align=right | 2.9 km || 
|-id=469 bgcolor=#d6d6d6
| 344469 ||  || — || October 27, 2008 || Kitt Peak || Spacewatch || — || align=right | 2.2 km || 
|-id=470 bgcolor=#E9E9E9
| 344470 ||  || — || August 4, 2002 || Palomar || NEAT || — || align=right | 2.6 km || 
|-id=471 bgcolor=#fefefe
| 344471 ||  || — || August 10, 2002 || Socorro || LINEAR || PHO || align=right | 3.7 km || 
|-id=472 bgcolor=#d6d6d6
| 344472 ||  || — || August 11, 2002 || Haleakala || NEAT || — || align=right | 3.5 km || 
|-id=473 bgcolor=#d6d6d6
| 344473 ||  || — || August 13, 2002 || Socorro || LINEAR || BRA || align=right | 1.7 km || 
|-id=474 bgcolor=#FA8072
| 344474 ||  || — || August 15, 2002 || Socorro || LINEAR || — || align=right | 5.4 km || 
|-id=475 bgcolor=#fefefe
| 344475 ||  || — || July 21, 2002 || Palomar || NEAT || FLO || align=right data-sort-value="0.64" | 640 m || 
|-id=476 bgcolor=#E9E9E9
| 344476 ||  || — || August 9, 2002 || Cerro Tololo || M. W. Buie || — || align=right | 1.9 km || 
|-id=477 bgcolor=#E9E9E9
| 344477 ||  || — || August 8, 2002 || Palomar || S. F. Hönig || — || align=right | 3.0 km || 
|-id=478 bgcolor=#E9E9E9
| 344478 ||  || — || August 8, 2002 || Palomar || A. Lowe || AGN || align=right | 1.5 km || 
|-id=479 bgcolor=#E9E9E9
| 344479 ||  || — || August 8, 2002 || Palomar || NEAT || AGN || align=right | 1.4 km || 
|-id=480 bgcolor=#d6d6d6
| 344480 ||  || — || August 8, 2002 || Palomar || NEAT || KOR || align=right | 1.4 km || 
|-id=481 bgcolor=#E9E9E9
| 344481 ||  || — || August 11, 2002 || Palomar || NEAT || HOF || align=right | 3.1 km || 
|-id=482 bgcolor=#E9E9E9
| 344482 ||  || — || August 15, 2002 || Palomar || NEAT || — || align=right | 2.4 km || 
|-id=483 bgcolor=#fefefe
| 344483 ||  || — || March 30, 2011 || Mount Lemmon || Mount Lemmon Survey || — || align=right data-sort-value="0.55" | 550 m || 
|-id=484 bgcolor=#E9E9E9
| 344484 ||  || — || March 11, 2005 || Mount Lemmon || Mount Lemmon Survey || — || align=right | 2.5 km || 
|-id=485 bgcolor=#E9E9E9
| 344485 ||  || — || December 21, 2008 || Kitt Peak || Spacewatch || — || align=right | 2.4 km || 
|-id=486 bgcolor=#E9E9E9
| 344486 ||  || — || August 27, 2002 || Palomar || NEAT || — || align=right | 2.5 km || 
|-id=487 bgcolor=#fefefe
| 344487 ||  || — || August 18, 2002 || Palomar || S. F. Hönig || — || align=right data-sort-value="0.68" | 680 m || 
|-id=488 bgcolor=#E9E9E9
| 344488 ||  || — || August 18, 2002 || Palomar || NEAT || — || align=right | 2.1 km || 
|-id=489 bgcolor=#fefefe
| 344489 ||  || — || August 18, 2002 || Palomar || NEAT || — || align=right data-sort-value="0.75" | 750 m || 
|-id=490 bgcolor=#fefefe
| 344490 ||  || — || February 10, 2007 || Mount Lemmon || Mount Lemmon Survey || FLO || align=right data-sort-value="0.60" | 600 m || 
|-id=491 bgcolor=#E9E9E9
| 344491 ||  || — || August 20, 2002 || Xinglong || SCAP || MRX || align=right | 1.2 km || 
|-id=492 bgcolor=#E9E9E9
| 344492 ||  || — || August 30, 2002 || Palomar || NEAT || — || align=right | 2.3 km || 
|-id=493 bgcolor=#E9E9E9
| 344493 ||  || — || August 17, 2002 || Palomar || NEAT || — || align=right | 2.1 km || 
|-id=494 bgcolor=#fefefe
| 344494 ||  || — || August 17, 2002 || Haleakala || NEAT || FLO || align=right data-sort-value="0.48" | 480 m || 
|-id=495 bgcolor=#E9E9E9
| 344495 ||  || — || August 18, 2002 || Palomar || NEAT || — || align=right | 3.5 km || 
|-id=496 bgcolor=#E9E9E9
| 344496 ||  || — || August 29, 2002 || Palomar || NEAT || — || align=right | 2.8 km || 
|-id=497 bgcolor=#E9E9E9
| 344497 ||  || — || August 27, 2002 || Palomar || NEAT || — || align=right | 2.4 km || 
|-id=498 bgcolor=#E9E9E9
| 344498 ||  || — || August 28, 2002 || Palomar || NEAT || HOF || align=right | 2.2 km || 
|-id=499 bgcolor=#E9E9E9
| 344499 ||  || — || August 18, 2002 || Palomar || NEAT || — || align=right | 2.6 km || 
|-id=500 bgcolor=#fefefe
| 344500 ||  || — || August 16, 2002 || Palomar || NEAT || — || align=right data-sort-value="0.53" | 530 m || 
|}

344501–344600 

|-bgcolor=#E9E9E9
| 344501 ||  || — || August 16, 2002 || Palomar || NEAT || AGN || align=right | 1.0 km || 
|-id=502 bgcolor=#E9E9E9
| 344502 ||  || — || September 12, 2007 || Anderson Mesa || LONEOS || — || align=right | 3.2 km || 
|-id=503 bgcolor=#d6d6d6
| 344503 ||  || — || July 21, 2007 || Antares || ARO || — || align=right | 2.9 km || 
|-id=504 bgcolor=#E9E9E9
| 344504 ||  || — || September 10, 2007 || Kitt Peak || Spacewatch || — || align=right | 1.8 km || 
|-id=505 bgcolor=#E9E9E9
| 344505 ||  || — || December 1, 2003 || Kitt Peak || Spacewatch || — || align=right | 2.1 km || 
|-id=506 bgcolor=#fefefe
| 344506 ||  || — || October 9, 1999 || Socorro || LINEAR || — || align=right data-sort-value="0.75" | 750 m || 
|-id=507 bgcolor=#fefefe
| 344507 ||  || — || September 4, 2002 || Palomar || NEAT || — || align=right data-sort-value="0.87" | 870 m || 
|-id=508 bgcolor=#fefefe
| 344508 ||  || — || September 5, 2002 || Socorro || LINEAR || — || align=right data-sort-value="0.64" | 640 m || 
|-id=509 bgcolor=#fefefe
| 344509 ||  || — || September 5, 2002 || Socorro || LINEAR || — || align=right | 1.2 km || 
|-id=510 bgcolor=#fefefe
| 344510 ||  || — || September 5, 2002 || Socorro || LINEAR || — || align=right data-sort-value="0.79" | 790 m || 
|-id=511 bgcolor=#fefefe
| 344511 ||  || — || September 5, 2002 || Socorro || LINEAR || — || align=right data-sort-value="0.86" | 860 m || 
|-id=512 bgcolor=#E9E9E9
| 344512 ||  || — || September 10, 2002 || Palomar || NEAT || INO || align=right | 1.2 km || 
|-id=513 bgcolor=#d6d6d6
| 344513 ||  || — || September 10, 2002 || Palomar || NEAT || — || align=right | 3.3 km || 
|-id=514 bgcolor=#d6d6d6
| 344514 ||  || — || September 13, 2002 || Anderson Mesa || LONEOS || — || align=right | 3.0 km || 
|-id=515 bgcolor=#E9E9E9
| 344515 ||  || — || September 14, 2002 || Palomar || R. Matson || WIT || align=right | 1.4 km || 
|-id=516 bgcolor=#E9E9E9
| 344516 ||  || — || September 14, 2002 || Palomar || NEAT || AGN || align=right | 1.2 km || 
|-id=517 bgcolor=#E9E9E9
| 344517 ||  || — || September 1, 2002 || Palomar || NEAT || — || align=right | 2.3 km || 
|-id=518 bgcolor=#fefefe
| 344518 ||  || — || September 4, 2002 || Palomar || NEAT || — || align=right data-sort-value="0.64" | 640 m || 
|-id=519 bgcolor=#E9E9E9
| 344519 ||  || — || September 9, 2007 || Mount Lemmon || Mount Lemmon Survey || — || align=right | 2.5 km || 
|-id=520 bgcolor=#FA8072
| 344520 ||  || — || September 26, 2002 || Palomar || NEAT || — || align=right data-sort-value="0.62" | 620 m || 
|-id=521 bgcolor=#d6d6d6
| 344521 ||  || — || September 27, 2002 || Palomar || NEAT || — || align=right | 2.7 km || 
|-id=522 bgcolor=#d6d6d6
| 344522 ||  || — || September 26, 2002 || Palomar || NEAT || — || align=right | 3.0 km || 
|-id=523 bgcolor=#fefefe
| 344523 ||  || — || September 30, 2002 || Haleakala || NEAT || V || align=right | 1.0 km || 
|-id=524 bgcolor=#d6d6d6
| 344524 ||  || — || October 1, 2002 || Anderson Mesa || LONEOS || — || align=right | 2.6 km || 
|-id=525 bgcolor=#fefefe
| 344525 ||  || — || September 28, 2002 || Palomar || NEAT || — || align=right data-sort-value="0.72" | 720 m || 
|-id=526 bgcolor=#d6d6d6
| 344526 ||  || — || October 2, 2002 || Haleakala || NEAT || — || align=right | 3.5 km || 
|-id=527 bgcolor=#d6d6d6
| 344527 ||  || — || October 4, 2002 || Anderson Mesa || LONEOS || — || align=right | 4.0 km || 
|-id=528 bgcolor=#d6d6d6
| 344528 ||  || — || October 5, 2002 || Palomar || NEAT || KOR || align=right | 1.4 km || 
|-id=529 bgcolor=#d6d6d6
| 344529 ||  || — || October 5, 2002 || Palomar || NEAT || — || align=right | 3.8 km || 
|-id=530 bgcolor=#d6d6d6
| 344530 ||  || — || October 5, 2002 || Palomar || NEAT || BRA || align=right | 2.4 km || 
|-id=531 bgcolor=#E9E9E9
| 344531 ||  || — || October 8, 2002 || Palomar || NEAT || — || align=right | 4.1 km || 
|-id=532 bgcolor=#FA8072
| 344532 ||  || — || October 6, 2002 || Socorro || LINEAR || — || align=right data-sort-value="0.82" | 820 m || 
|-id=533 bgcolor=#d6d6d6
| 344533 ||  || — || October 7, 2002 || Haleakala || NEAT || TRP || align=right | 3.1 km || 
|-id=534 bgcolor=#d6d6d6
| 344534 ||  || — || October 4, 2002 || Apache Point || SDSS || — || align=right | 3.0 km || 
|-id=535 bgcolor=#d6d6d6
| 344535 ||  || — || October 5, 2002 || Apache Point || SDSS || KOR || align=right | 1.3 km || 
|-id=536 bgcolor=#d6d6d6
| 344536 ||  || — || October 5, 2002 || Apache Point || SDSS || KOR || align=right | 1.2 km || 
|-id=537 bgcolor=#d6d6d6
| 344537 ||  || — || October 5, 2002 || Palomar || NEAT || — || align=right | 3.1 km || 
|-id=538 bgcolor=#fefefe
| 344538 ||  || — || October 4, 2002 || Palomar || NEAT || — || align=right data-sort-value="0.80" | 800 m || 
|-id=539 bgcolor=#fefefe
| 344539 ||  || — || October 15, 2002 || Palomar || NEAT || FLO || align=right data-sort-value="0.61" | 610 m || 
|-id=540 bgcolor=#fefefe
| 344540 ||  || — || October 15, 2002 || Palomar || NEAT || — || align=right | 1.1 km || 
|-id=541 bgcolor=#E9E9E9
| 344541 ||  || — || October 29, 2002 || Apache Point || SDSS || — || align=right | 2.5 km || 
|-id=542 bgcolor=#fefefe
| 344542 ||  || — || November 1, 2002 || Palomar || NEAT || — || align=right data-sort-value="0.89" | 890 m || 
|-id=543 bgcolor=#d6d6d6
| 344543 ||  || — || November 2, 2002 || Haleakala || NEAT || — || align=right | 3.1 km || 
|-id=544 bgcolor=#fefefe
| 344544 ||  || — || November 6, 2002 || Anderson Mesa || LONEOS || — || align=right | 1.1 km || 
|-id=545 bgcolor=#d6d6d6
| 344545 ||  || — || November 7, 2002 || Socorro || LINEAR || — || align=right | 3.1 km || 
|-id=546 bgcolor=#d6d6d6
| 344546 ||  || — || November 7, 2002 || Socorro || LINEAR || — || align=right | 3.8 km || 
|-id=547 bgcolor=#fefefe
| 344547 ||  || — || November 8, 2002 || Socorro || LINEAR || — || align=right data-sort-value="0.74" | 740 m || 
|-id=548 bgcolor=#fefefe
| 344548 ||  || — || November 11, 2002 || Socorro || LINEAR || FLO || align=right data-sort-value="0.70" | 700 m || 
|-id=549 bgcolor=#fefefe
| 344549 ||  || — || November 12, 2002 || Socorro || LINEAR || — || align=right data-sort-value="0.91" | 910 m || 
|-id=550 bgcolor=#fefefe
| 344550 ||  || — || November 12, 2002 || Socorro || LINEAR || — || align=right data-sort-value="0.88" | 880 m || 
|-id=551 bgcolor=#FA8072
| 344551 ||  || — || November 13, 2002 || Palomar || NEAT || — || align=right data-sort-value="0.97" | 970 m || 
|-id=552 bgcolor=#d6d6d6
| 344552 ||  || — || November 1, 2002 || Palomar || NEAT || 628 || align=right | 2.1 km || 
|-id=553 bgcolor=#fefefe
| 344553 ||  || — || December 15, 2009 || Mount Lemmon || Mount Lemmon Survey || FLO || align=right data-sort-value="0.72" | 720 m || 
|-id=554 bgcolor=#fefefe
| 344554 ||  || — || November 25, 2002 || Palomar || S. F. Hönig || — || align=right data-sort-value="0.89" | 890 m || 
|-id=555 bgcolor=#fefefe
| 344555 ||  || — || December 27, 2006 || Mount Lemmon || Mount Lemmon Survey || NYS || align=right | 1.9 km || 
|-id=556 bgcolor=#C2FFFF
| 344556 ||  || — || November 25, 2002 || Palomar || NEAT || L5 || align=right | 8.0 km || 
|-id=557 bgcolor=#fefefe
| 344557 ||  || — || July 31, 2005 || Palomar || NEAT || — || align=right data-sort-value="0.93" | 930 m || 
|-id=558 bgcolor=#d6d6d6
| 344558 ||  || — || December 3, 2002 || Palomar || NEAT || — || align=right | 3.1 km || 
|-id=559 bgcolor=#fefefe
| 344559 ||  || — || December 3, 2002 || Palomar || NEAT || — || align=right data-sort-value="0.95" | 950 m || 
|-id=560 bgcolor=#fefefe
| 344560 ||  || — || December 6, 2002 || Socorro || LINEAR || FLO || align=right data-sort-value="0.88" | 880 m || 
|-id=561 bgcolor=#fefefe
| 344561 ||  || — || December 6, 2002 || Socorro || LINEAR || — || align=right data-sort-value="0.86" | 860 m || 
|-id=562 bgcolor=#fefefe
| 344562 ||  || — || December 5, 2002 || Socorro || LINEAR || FLO || align=right data-sort-value="0.81" | 810 m || 
|-id=563 bgcolor=#fefefe
| 344563 ||  || — || December 7, 2002 || Desert Eagle || W. K. Y. Yeung || — || align=right | 1.1 km || 
|-id=564 bgcolor=#d6d6d6
| 344564 ||  || — || December 6, 2002 || Socorro || LINEAR || MEL || align=right | 4.9 km || 
|-id=565 bgcolor=#fefefe
| 344565 ||  || — || December 6, 2002 || Socorro || LINEAR || — || align=right data-sort-value="0.92" | 920 m || 
|-id=566 bgcolor=#fefefe
| 344566 ||  || — || December 9, 2002 || Kitt Peak || Spacewatch || FLO || align=right data-sort-value="0.73" | 730 m || 
|-id=567 bgcolor=#d6d6d6
| 344567 ||  || — || December 10, 2002 || Socorro || LINEAR || — || align=right | 4.5 km || 
|-id=568 bgcolor=#fefefe
| 344568 ||  || — || December 5, 2002 || Socorro || LINEAR || FLO || align=right data-sort-value="0.83" | 830 m || 
|-id=569 bgcolor=#d6d6d6
| 344569 ||  || — || December 11, 2002 || Apache Point || SDSS || HYG || align=right | 3.4 km || 
|-id=570 bgcolor=#fefefe
| 344570 ||  || — || December 11, 2002 || Palomar || NEAT || FLO || align=right data-sort-value="0.68" | 680 m || 
|-id=571 bgcolor=#d6d6d6
| 344571 ||  || — || December 10, 2002 || Palomar || NEAT || EOS || align=right | 2.7 km || 
|-id=572 bgcolor=#fefefe
| 344572 ||  || — || January 4, 2003 || Nashville || R. Clingan || FLO || align=right data-sort-value="0.83" | 830 m || 
|-id=573 bgcolor=#d6d6d6
| 344573 ||  || — || January 5, 2003 || Tebbutt || F. B. Zoltowski || EOS || align=right | 2.6 km || 
|-id=574 bgcolor=#fefefe
| 344574 ||  || — || January 7, 2003 || Socorro || LINEAR || — || align=right | 1.1 km || 
|-id=575 bgcolor=#d6d6d6
| 344575 ||  || — || December 31, 2002 || Socorro || LINEAR || — || align=right | 4.1 km || 
|-id=576 bgcolor=#fefefe
| 344576 ||  || — || January 7, 2003 || Socorro || LINEAR || — || align=right | 1.3 km || 
|-id=577 bgcolor=#fefefe
| 344577 ||  || — || January 10, 2003 || Kitt Peak || Spacewatch || — || align=right data-sort-value="0.68" | 680 m || 
|-id=578 bgcolor=#d6d6d6
| 344578 ||  || — || January 11, 2003 || Socorro || LINEAR || — || align=right | 5.8 km || 
|-id=579 bgcolor=#d6d6d6
| 344579 ||  || — || January 10, 2003 || Socorro || LINEAR || — || align=right | 4.0 km || 
|-id=580 bgcolor=#d6d6d6
| 344580 ||  || — || January 10, 2003 || Socorro || LINEAR || — || align=right | 3.0 km || 
|-id=581 bgcolor=#d6d6d6
| 344581 Albisetti ||  ||  || January 24, 2003 || Sormano || Sormano Obs. || — || align=right | 3.0 km || 
|-id=582 bgcolor=#fefefe
| 344582 ||  || — || January 25, 2003 || Anderson Mesa || LONEOS || — || align=right | 1.0 km || 
|-id=583 bgcolor=#fefefe
| 344583 ||  || — || January 30, 2003 || Anderson Mesa || LONEOS || — || align=right data-sort-value="0.98" | 980 m || 
|-id=584 bgcolor=#d6d6d6
| 344584 ||  || — || January 29, 2003 || Palomar || NEAT || — || align=right | 4.0 km || 
|-id=585 bgcolor=#d6d6d6
| 344585 ||  || — || January 30, 2003 || Socorro || LINEAR || — || align=right | 4.3 km || 
|-id=586 bgcolor=#d6d6d6
| 344586 ||  || — || January 31, 2003 || Kitt Peak || Spacewatch || — || align=right | 2.7 km || 
|-id=587 bgcolor=#d6d6d6
| 344587 ||  || — || January 29, 2003 || Palomar || NEAT || — || align=right | 2.6 km || 
|-id=588 bgcolor=#d6d6d6
| 344588 ||  || — || January 31, 2003 || Socorro || LINEAR || — || align=right | 3.4 km || 
|-id=589 bgcolor=#d6d6d6
| 344589 ||  || — || January 31, 2003 || Socorro || LINEAR || EUP || align=right | 4.9 km || 
|-id=590 bgcolor=#d6d6d6
| 344590 ||  || — || January 27, 2003 || Anderson Mesa || LONEOS || URS || align=right | 4.3 km || 
|-id=591 bgcolor=#d6d6d6
| 344591 ||  || — || January 26, 2003 || Palomar || NEAT || — || align=right | 3.5 km || 
|-id=592 bgcolor=#d6d6d6
| 344592 ||  || — || January 17, 2003 || Palomar || NEAT || — || align=right | 3.8 km || 
|-id=593 bgcolor=#d6d6d6
| 344593 ||  || — || September 28, 2001 || Palomar || NEAT || — || align=right | 3.7 km || 
|-id=594 bgcolor=#fefefe
| 344594 ||  || — || February 1, 2003 || Socorro || LINEAR || — || align=right | 1.1 km || 
|-id=595 bgcolor=#fefefe
| 344595 ||  || — || February 5, 2003 || Wrightwood || J. W. Young || — || align=right data-sort-value="0.86" | 860 m || 
|-id=596 bgcolor=#fefefe
| 344596 ||  || — || February 3, 2003 || Palomar || NEAT || ERI || align=right | 2.0 km || 
|-id=597 bgcolor=#fefefe
| 344597 ||  || — || February 22, 2003 || Palomar || NEAT || — || align=right | 1.2 km || 
|-id=598 bgcolor=#d6d6d6
| 344598 ||  || — || February 23, 2003 || Socorro || LINEAR || EUP || align=right | 6.9 km || 
|-id=599 bgcolor=#d6d6d6
| 344599 ||  || — || February 25, 2003 || Haleakala || NEAT || — || align=right | 4.5 km || 
|-id=600 bgcolor=#d6d6d6
| 344600 ||  || — || February 21, 2003 || Palomar || NEAT || EUP || align=right | 3.4 km || 
|}

344601–344700 

|-bgcolor=#fefefe
| 344601 ||  || — || March 7, 2003 || Palomar || NEAT || — || align=right | 1.0 km || 
|-id=602 bgcolor=#fefefe
| 344602 ||  || — || March 7, 2003 || Palomar || NEAT || — || align=right data-sort-value="0.94" | 940 m || 
|-id=603 bgcolor=#d6d6d6
| 344603 ||  || — || March 9, 2003 || Palomar || NEAT || EUP || align=right | 3.5 km || 
|-id=604 bgcolor=#fefefe
| 344604 ||  || — || March 6, 2003 || Anderson Mesa || LONEOS || MAS || align=right data-sort-value="0.74" | 740 m || 
|-id=605 bgcolor=#fefefe
| 344605 ||  || — || March 6, 2003 || Anderson Mesa || LONEOS || — || align=right | 1.2 km || 
|-id=606 bgcolor=#d6d6d6
| 344606 ||  || — || March 6, 2003 || Palomar || NEAT || — || align=right | 3.4 km || 
|-id=607 bgcolor=#d6d6d6
| 344607 ||  || — || March 7, 2003 || Socorro || LINEAR || Tj (2.93) || align=right | 4.4 km || 
|-id=608 bgcolor=#d6d6d6
| 344608 ||  || — || March 7, 2003 || Kitt Peak || Spacewatch || URS || align=right | 5.0 km || 
|-id=609 bgcolor=#fefefe
| 344609 ||  || — || March 9, 2003 || Kitt Peak || Spacewatch || H || align=right data-sort-value="0.78" | 780 m || 
|-id=610 bgcolor=#d6d6d6
| 344610 ||  || — || March 8, 2003 || Palomar || NEAT || — || align=right | 4.3 km || 
|-id=611 bgcolor=#d6d6d6
| 344611 ||  || — || March 9, 2003 || Anderson Mesa || LONEOS || — || align=right | 3.9 km || 
|-id=612 bgcolor=#fefefe
| 344612 ||  || — || March 11, 2003 || Palomar || NEAT || — || align=right | 1.2 km || 
|-id=613 bgcolor=#d6d6d6
| 344613 ||  || — || March 23, 2003 || Palomar || NEAT || EUP || align=right | 6.1 km || 
|-id=614 bgcolor=#d6d6d6
| 344614 ||  || — || March 24, 2003 || Socorro || LINEAR || EUP || align=right | 5.5 km || 
|-id=615 bgcolor=#fefefe
| 344615 ||  || — || March 30, 2003 || Socorro || LINEAR || H || align=right data-sort-value="0.94" | 940 m || 
|-id=616 bgcolor=#fefefe
| 344616 ||  || — || March 30, 2003 || Socorro || LINEAR || H || align=right data-sort-value="0.94" | 940 m || 
|-id=617 bgcolor=#fefefe
| 344617 ||  || — || March 23, 2003 || Kitt Peak || Spacewatch || NYS || align=right data-sort-value="0.63" | 630 m || 
|-id=618 bgcolor=#fefefe
| 344618 ||  || — || March 24, 2003 || Kitt Peak || Spacewatch || — || align=right data-sort-value="0.87" | 870 m || 
|-id=619 bgcolor=#fefefe
| 344619 ||  || — || March 25, 2003 || Haleakala || NEAT || — || align=right data-sort-value="0.89" | 890 m || 
|-id=620 bgcolor=#fefefe
| 344620 ||  || — || March 24, 2003 || Kitt Peak || Spacewatch || — || align=right | 1.1 km || 
|-id=621 bgcolor=#fefefe
| 344621 ||  || — || March 24, 2003 || Kitt Peak || Spacewatch || MAS || align=right data-sort-value="0.77" | 770 m || 
|-id=622 bgcolor=#fefefe
| 344622 ||  || — || March 26, 2003 || Palomar || NEAT || — || align=right | 1.1 km || 
|-id=623 bgcolor=#fefefe
| 344623 ||  || — || April 5, 2003 || Kitt Peak || Spacewatch || EUT || align=right data-sort-value="0.72" | 720 m || 
|-id=624 bgcolor=#fefefe
| 344624 ||  || — || April 24, 2003 || Kitt Peak || Spacewatch || MAS || align=right data-sort-value="0.82" | 820 m || 
|-id=625 bgcolor=#E9E9E9
| 344625 ||  || — || April 26, 2003 || Kitt Peak || Spacewatch || — || align=right data-sort-value="0.89" | 890 m || 
|-id=626 bgcolor=#d6d6d6
| 344626 ||  || — || April 27, 2003 || Socorro || LINEAR || Tj (2.98) || align=right | 3.5 km || 
|-id=627 bgcolor=#fefefe
| 344627 ||  || — || May 1, 2003 || Kitt Peak || Spacewatch || — || align=right data-sort-value="0.91" | 910 m || 
|-id=628 bgcolor=#E9E9E9
| 344628 ||  || — || May 1, 2003 || Socorro || LINEAR || — || align=right | 1.3 km || 
|-id=629 bgcolor=#C2FFFF
| 344629 ||  || — || May 1, 2003 || Kitt Peak || Spacewatch || L4ERY || align=right | 8.9 km || 
|-id=630 bgcolor=#E9E9E9
| 344630 ||  || — || May 27, 2003 || Haleakala || NEAT || — || align=right data-sort-value="0.98" | 980 m || 
|-id=631 bgcolor=#FA8072
| 344631 ||  || — || June 4, 2003 || Socorro || LINEAR || — || align=right | 2.2 km || 
|-id=632 bgcolor=#E9E9E9
| 344632 ||  || — || July 23, 2003 || Palomar || NEAT || KON || align=right | 4.1 km || 
|-id=633 bgcolor=#E9E9E9
| 344633 ||  || — || July 22, 2003 || Palomar || NEAT || GER || align=right | 1.9 km || 
|-id=634 bgcolor=#E9E9E9
| 344634 ||  || — || July 25, 2003 || Socorro || LINEAR || — || align=right | 1.5 km || 
|-id=635 bgcolor=#E9E9E9
| 344635 ||  || — || July 22, 2003 || Palomar || NEAT || — || align=right | 2.3 km || 
|-id=636 bgcolor=#E9E9E9
| 344636 ||  || — || August 1, 2003 || Haleakala || NEAT || — || align=right | 1.2 km || 
|-id=637 bgcolor=#E9E9E9
| 344637 ||  || — || August 18, 2003 || Campo Imperatore || CINEOS || — || align=right | 1.7 km || 
|-id=638 bgcolor=#E9E9E9
| 344638 ||  || — || August 20, 2003 || Campo Imperatore || CINEOS || — || align=right | 1.6 km || 
|-id=639 bgcolor=#E9E9E9
| 344639 ||  || — || August 21, 2003 || Haleakala || NEAT || — || align=right | 2.3 km || 
|-id=640 bgcolor=#E9E9E9
| 344640 ||  || — || August 22, 2003 || Palomar || NEAT || — || align=right | 1.7 km || 
|-id=641 bgcolor=#E9E9E9
| 344641 Szeleczky ||  ||  || August 23, 2003 || Piszkéstető || K. Sárneczky, B. Sipőcz || — || align=right | 1.5 km || 
|-id=642 bgcolor=#E9E9E9
| 344642 ||  || — || August 21, 2003 || Haleakala || NEAT || — || align=right | 1.8 km || 
|-id=643 bgcolor=#E9E9E9
| 344643 ||  || — || July 24, 2003 || Palomar || NEAT || — || align=right | 1.5 km || 
|-id=644 bgcolor=#E9E9E9
| 344644 ||  || — || August 23, 2003 || Socorro || LINEAR || IAN || align=right | 1.3 km || 
|-id=645 bgcolor=#E9E9E9
| 344645 ||  || — || August 23, 2003 || Palomar || NEAT || RAF || align=right | 1.3 km || 
|-id=646 bgcolor=#E9E9E9
| 344646 ||  || — || August 23, 2003 || Palomar || NEAT || — || align=right | 2.8 km || 
|-id=647 bgcolor=#E9E9E9
| 344647 ||  || — || August 26, 2003 || Kleť || Kleť Obs. || fast? || align=right | 1.7 km || 
|-id=648 bgcolor=#E9E9E9
| 344648 ||  || — || August 24, 2003 || Socorro || LINEAR || — || align=right | 1.6 km || 
|-id=649 bgcolor=#E9E9E9
| 344649 ||  || — || August 29, 2003 || Haleakala || NEAT || ADE || align=right | 2.3 km || 
|-id=650 bgcolor=#E9E9E9
| 344650 ||  || — || August 31, 2003 || Haleakala || NEAT || MAR || align=right | 1.6 km || 
|-id=651 bgcolor=#E9E9E9
| 344651 ||  || — || September 4, 2003 || Socorro || LINEAR || — || align=right | 2.0 km || 
|-id=652 bgcolor=#E9E9E9
| 344652 ||  || — || September 14, 2003 || Haleakala || NEAT || — || align=right | 1.6 km || 
|-id=653 bgcolor=#E9E9E9
| 344653 ||  || — || September 3, 2003 || Haleakala || NEAT || — || align=right | 2.7 km || 
|-id=654 bgcolor=#E9E9E9
| 344654 ||  || — || September 16, 2003 || Kitt Peak || Spacewatch || — || align=right | 1.7 km || 
|-id=655 bgcolor=#E9E9E9
| 344655 ||  || — || September 17, 2003 || Haleakala || NEAT || DOR || align=right | 3.1 km || 
|-id=656 bgcolor=#E9E9E9
| 344656 ||  || — || September 16, 2003 || Palomar || NEAT || EUN || align=right | 1.4 km || 
|-id=657 bgcolor=#E9E9E9
| 344657 ||  || — || September 16, 2003 || Anderson Mesa || LONEOS || — || align=right | 2.0 km || 
|-id=658 bgcolor=#E9E9E9
| 344658 ||  || — || September 16, 2003 || Anderson Mesa || LONEOS || — || align=right | 2.0 km || 
|-id=659 bgcolor=#E9E9E9
| 344659 ||  || — || September 18, 2003 || Anderson Mesa || LONEOS || — || align=right | 1.9 km || 
|-id=660 bgcolor=#E9E9E9
| 344660 ||  || — || September 19, 2003 || Campo Imperatore || CINEOS || EUN || align=right | 2.0 km || 
|-id=661 bgcolor=#E9E9E9
| 344661 ||  || — || September 18, 2003 || Kitt Peak || Spacewatch || — || align=right | 1.5 km || 
|-id=662 bgcolor=#E9E9E9
| 344662 ||  || — || September 18, 2003 || Kitt Peak || Spacewatch || MIS || align=right | 2.8 km || 
|-id=663 bgcolor=#E9E9E9
| 344663 ||  || — || September 17, 2003 || Campo Imperatore || CINEOS || — || align=right | 1.2 km || 
|-id=664 bgcolor=#E9E9E9
| 344664 ||  || — || September 20, 2003 || Haleakala || NEAT || — || align=right | 1.9 km || 
|-id=665 bgcolor=#E9E9E9
| 344665 ||  || — || September 15, 2003 || Palomar || NEAT || — || align=right | 2.4 km || 
|-id=666 bgcolor=#E9E9E9
| 344666 ||  || — || September 16, 2003 || Kitt Peak || Spacewatch || — || align=right | 1.3 km || 
|-id=667 bgcolor=#E9E9E9
| 344667 ||  || — || September 20, 2003 || Palomar || NEAT || — || align=right | 1.7 km || 
|-id=668 bgcolor=#E9E9E9
| 344668 ||  || — || September 16, 2003 || Kitt Peak || Spacewatch || — || align=right | 2.9 km || 
|-id=669 bgcolor=#E9E9E9
| 344669 ||  || — || September 16, 2003 || Kitt Peak || Spacewatch || — || align=right | 2.5 km || 
|-id=670 bgcolor=#E9E9E9
| 344670 ||  || — || September 19, 2003 || Anderson Mesa || LONEOS || — || align=right | 3.4 km || 
|-id=671 bgcolor=#E9E9E9
| 344671 ||  || — || September 19, 2003 || Anderson Mesa || LONEOS || — || align=right | 3.2 km || 
|-id=672 bgcolor=#E9E9E9
| 344672 ||  || — || September 16, 2003 || Anderson Mesa || LONEOS || GEF || align=right | 1.6 km || 
|-id=673 bgcolor=#E9E9E9
| 344673 ||  || — || September 23, 2003 || Palomar || NEAT || — || align=right | 2.4 km || 
|-id=674 bgcolor=#E9E9E9
| 344674 ||  || — || September 18, 2003 || Palomar || NEAT || — || align=right | 1.6 km || 
|-id=675 bgcolor=#E9E9E9
| 344675 ||  || — || September 22, 2003 || Anderson Mesa || LONEOS || — || align=right | 1.4 km || 
|-id=676 bgcolor=#E9E9E9
| 344676 ||  || — || September 22, 2003 || Socorro || LINEAR || — || align=right | 2.3 km || 
|-id=677 bgcolor=#E9E9E9
| 344677 ||  || — || August 25, 2003 || Palomar || NEAT || — || align=right | 1.7 km || 
|-id=678 bgcolor=#E9E9E9
| 344678 ||  || — || September 22, 2003 || Kitt Peak || Spacewatch || JUN || align=right | 1.4 km || 
|-id=679 bgcolor=#E9E9E9
| 344679 ||  || — || September 17, 2003 || Kitt Peak || Spacewatch || — || align=right | 2.0 km || 
|-id=680 bgcolor=#E9E9E9
| 344680 ||  || — || September 24, 2003 || Haleakala || NEAT || — || align=right | 2.3 km || 
|-id=681 bgcolor=#E9E9E9
| 344681 ||  || — || September 26, 2003 || Socorro || LINEAR || ADE || align=right | 2.4 km || 
|-id=682 bgcolor=#E9E9E9
| 344682 ||  || — || September 18, 2003 || Palomar || NEAT || — || align=right | 2.5 km || 
|-id=683 bgcolor=#E9E9E9
| 344683 ||  || — || September 28, 2003 || Socorro || LINEAR || PAD || align=right | 1.9 km || 
|-id=684 bgcolor=#E9E9E9
| 344684 ||  || — || September 25, 2003 || Palomar || NEAT || — || align=right | 1.4 km || 
|-id=685 bgcolor=#E9E9E9
| 344685 ||  || — || September 27, 2003 || Socorro || LINEAR || — || align=right | 1.7 km || 
|-id=686 bgcolor=#E9E9E9
| 344686 ||  || — || September 30, 2003 || Socorro || LINEAR || — || align=right | 2.3 km || 
|-id=687 bgcolor=#E9E9E9
| 344687 ||  || — || September 28, 2003 || Anderson Mesa || LONEOS || — || align=right | 1.8 km || 
|-id=688 bgcolor=#E9E9E9
| 344688 ||  || — || September 18, 2003 || Haleakala || NEAT || — || align=right | 2.8 km || 
|-id=689 bgcolor=#E9E9E9
| 344689 ||  || — || September 29, 2003 || Kitt Peak || Spacewatch || — || align=right | 1.6 km || 
|-id=690 bgcolor=#E9E9E9
| 344690 ||  || — || September 27, 2003 || Goodricke-Pigott || R. A. Tucker || — || align=right | 1.8 km || 
|-id=691 bgcolor=#E9E9E9
| 344691 ||  || — || September 19, 2003 || Socorro || LINEAR || JUN || align=right | 1.2 km || 
|-id=692 bgcolor=#E9E9E9
| 344692 ||  || — || September 26, 2003 || Apache Point || SDSS || — || align=right | 2.1 km || 
|-id=693 bgcolor=#E9E9E9
| 344693 ||  || — || September 18, 2003 || Kitt Peak || Spacewatch || — || align=right | 1.9 km || 
|-id=694 bgcolor=#E9E9E9
| 344694 ||  || — || September 19, 2003 || Kitt Peak || Spacewatch || — || align=right | 1.4 km || 
|-id=695 bgcolor=#E9E9E9
| 344695 ||  || — || September 26, 2003 || Apache Point || SDSS || — || align=right | 1.3 km || 
|-id=696 bgcolor=#E9E9E9
| 344696 ||  || — || September 26, 2003 || Apache Point || SDSS || NEM || align=right | 2.4 km || 
|-id=697 bgcolor=#E9E9E9
| 344697 ||  || — || September 26, 2003 || Apache Point || SDSS || — || align=right | 1.9 km || 
|-id=698 bgcolor=#E9E9E9
| 344698 ||  || — || September 26, 2003 || Apache Point || SDSS || — || align=right | 2.2 km || 
|-id=699 bgcolor=#E9E9E9
| 344699 ||  || — || October 16, 2003 || Palomar || NEAT || — || align=right | 2.4 km || 
|-id=700 bgcolor=#E9E9E9
| 344700 ||  || — || September 25, 2003 || Mauna Kea || P. A. Wiegert || — || align=right | 1.3 km || 
|}

344701–344800 

|-bgcolor=#E9E9E9
| 344701 ||  || — || September 29, 2003 || Kitt Peak || Spacewatch || — || align=right | 2.4 km || 
|-id=702 bgcolor=#E9E9E9
| 344702 ||  || — || September 18, 2003 || Kitt Peak || Spacewatch || HEN || align=right data-sort-value="0.98" | 980 m || 
|-id=703 bgcolor=#E9E9E9
| 344703 ||  || — || October 3, 2003 || Kitt Peak || Spacewatch || — || align=right | 2.5 km || 
|-id=704 bgcolor=#E9E9E9
| 344704 ||  || — || September 20, 2003 || Socorro || LINEAR || — || align=right | 1.9 km || 
|-id=705 bgcolor=#E9E9E9
| 344705 ||  || — || October 15, 2003 || Anderson Mesa || LONEOS || — || align=right | 2.3 km || 
|-id=706 bgcolor=#E9E9E9
| 344706 ||  || — || October 1, 2003 || Kitt Peak || Spacewatch || — || align=right | 2.5 km || 
|-id=707 bgcolor=#E9E9E9
| 344707 ||  || — || October 2, 2003 || Haleakala || NEAT || — || align=right | 2.1 km || 
|-id=708 bgcolor=#E9E9E9
| 344708 ||  || — || October 3, 2003 || Kitt Peak || Spacewatch || — || align=right | 1.5 km || 
|-id=709 bgcolor=#E9E9E9
| 344709 ||  || — || October 5, 2003 || Kitt Peak || Spacewatch || — || align=right | 1.4 km || 
|-id=710 bgcolor=#E9E9E9
| 344710 ||  || — || October 5, 2003 || Kitt Peak || Spacewatch || — || align=right | 1.5 km || 
|-id=711 bgcolor=#E9E9E9
| 344711 ||  || — || October 5, 2003 || Kitt Peak || Spacewatch || WIT || align=right | 1.2 km || 
|-id=712 bgcolor=#E9E9E9
| 344712 ||  || — || October 16, 2003 || Socorro || LINEAR || BAR || align=right | 2.0 km || 
|-id=713 bgcolor=#E9E9E9
| 344713 ||  || — || September 27, 2003 || Kitt Peak || Spacewatch || — || align=right | 1.9 km || 
|-id=714 bgcolor=#E9E9E9
| 344714 ||  || — || October 20, 2003 || Kitt Peak || Spacewatch || WIT || align=right | 1.3 km || 
|-id=715 bgcolor=#E9E9E9
| 344715 ||  || — || October 22, 2003 || Kingsnake || J. V. McClusky || — || align=right | 2.5 km || 
|-id=716 bgcolor=#E9E9E9
| 344716 ||  || — || October 16, 2003 || Kitt Peak || Spacewatch || — || align=right | 2.2 km || 
|-id=717 bgcolor=#E9E9E9
| 344717 ||  || — || October 16, 2003 || Palomar || NEAT || — || align=right | 2.3 km || 
|-id=718 bgcolor=#E9E9E9
| 344718 ||  || — || October 18, 2003 || Kitt Peak || Spacewatch || HEN || align=right | 1.1 km || 
|-id=719 bgcolor=#E9E9E9
| 344719 ||  || — || October 19, 2003 || Kitt Peak || Spacewatch || — || align=right | 2.0 km || 
|-id=720 bgcolor=#E9E9E9
| 344720 ||  || — || October 17, 2003 || Anderson Mesa || LONEOS || — || align=right | 3.5 km || 
|-id=721 bgcolor=#E9E9E9
| 344721 ||  || — || October 17, 2003 || Anderson Mesa || LONEOS || ADE || align=right | 4.1 km || 
|-id=722 bgcolor=#E9E9E9
| 344722 ||  || — || October 16, 2003 || Anderson Mesa || LONEOS || — || align=right | 2.8 km || 
|-id=723 bgcolor=#E9E9E9
| 344723 ||  || — || October 20, 2003 || Palomar || NEAT || — || align=right | 1.7 km || 
|-id=724 bgcolor=#d6d6d6
| 344724 ||  || — || October 18, 2003 || Kitt Peak || Spacewatch || — || align=right | 2.8 km || 
|-id=725 bgcolor=#E9E9E9
| 344725 ||  || — || October 18, 2003 || Kitt Peak || Spacewatch || WIT || align=right | 1.2 km || 
|-id=726 bgcolor=#E9E9E9
| 344726 ||  || — || October 21, 2003 || Socorro || LINEAR || MRX || align=right | 1.3 km || 
|-id=727 bgcolor=#E9E9E9
| 344727 ||  || — || October 18, 2003 || Kitt Peak || Spacewatch || HNS || align=right | 1.5 km || 
|-id=728 bgcolor=#E9E9E9
| 344728 ||  || — || October 20, 2003 || Kitt Peak || Spacewatch || — || align=right | 1.7 km || 
|-id=729 bgcolor=#E9E9E9
| 344729 ||  || — || October 20, 2003 || Socorro || LINEAR || — || align=right | 2.0 km || 
|-id=730 bgcolor=#E9E9E9
| 344730 ||  || — || October 19, 2003 || Palomar || NEAT || — || align=right | 2.1 km || 
|-id=731 bgcolor=#E9E9E9
| 344731 ||  || — || September 27, 2003 || Kitt Peak || Spacewatch || — || align=right | 1.3 km || 
|-id=732 bgcolor=#E9E9E9
| 344732 ||  || — || October 21, 2003 || Socorro || LINEAR || NEM || align=right | 3.4 km || 
|-id=733 bgcolor=#E9E9E9
| 344733 ||  || — || October 16, 2003 || Anderson Mesa || LONEOS || — || align=right | 2.0 km || 
|-id=734 bgcolor=#E9E9E9
| 344734 ||  || — || October 18, 2003 || Anderson Mesa || LONEOS || — || align=right | 2.1 km || 
|-id=735 bgcolor=#E9E9E9
| 344735 ||  || — || October 20, 2003 || Socorro || LINEAR || — || align=right | 2.2 km || 
|-id=736 bgcolor=#E9E9E9
| 344736 ||  || — || October 19, 2003 || Anderson Mesa || LONEOS || EUN || align=right | 1.6 km || 
|-id=737 bgcolor=#E9E9E9
| 344737 ||  || — || October 21, 2003 || Kitt Peak || Spacewatch || WIT || align=right data-sort-value="0.94" | 940 m || 
|-id=738 bgcolor=#d6d6d6
| 344738 ||  || — || October 21, 2003 || Socorro || LINEAR || — || align=right | 3.1 km || 
|-id=739 bgcolor=#E9E9E9
| 344739 ||  || — || October 21, 2003 || Kitt Peak || Spacewatch || — || align=right | 1.7 km || 
|-id=740 bgcolor=#E9E9E9
| 344740 ||  || — || September 22, 2003 || Kitt Peak || Spacewatch || — || align=right | 2.8 km || 
|-id=741 bgcolor=#E9E9E9
| 344741 ||  || — || October 21, 2003 || Kitt Peak || Spacewatch || — || align=right | 2.5 km || 
|-id=742 bgcolor=#E9E9E9
| 344742 ||  || — || October 22, 2003 || Kitt Peak || Spacewatch || ADE || align=right | 2.3 km || 
|-id=743 bgcolor=#E9E9E9
| 344743 ||  || — || October 24, 2003 || Socorro || LINEAR || — || align=right | 1.8 km || 
|-id=744 bgcolor=#E9E9E9
| 344744 ||  || — || October 24, 2003 || Socorro || LINEAR || — || align=right | 1.9 km || 
|-id=745 bgcolor=#E9E9E9
| 344745 ||  || — || October 24, 2003 || Kitt Peak || Spacewatch || AEO || align=right | 1.3 km || 
|-id=746 bgcolor=#E9E9E9
| 344746 ||  || — || October 24, 2003 || Kitt Peak || Spacewatch || — || align=right | 2.2 km || 
|-id=747 bgcolor=#E9E9E9
| 344747 ||  || — || October 30, 2003 || Socorro || LINEAR || — || align=right | 2.5 km || 
|-id=748 bgcolor=#E9E9E9
| 344748 ||  || — || October 21, 2003 || Palomar || NEAT || — || align=right | 1.5 km || 
|-id=749 bgcolor=#E9E9E9
| 344749 ||  || — || September 26, 2003 || Bergisch Gladbac || W. Bickel || — || align=right | 1.8 km || 
|-id=750 bgcolor=#E9E9E9
| 344750 ||  || — || October 22, 2003 || Apache Point || SDSS || EUN || align=right | 1.2 km || 
|-id=751 bgcolor=#E9E9E9
| 344751 ||  || — || October 20, 2003 || Kitt Peak || Spacewatch || — || align=right | 2.6 km || 
|-id=752 bgcolor=#E9E9E9
| 344752 ||  || — || October 17, 2003 || Apache Point || SDSS || JUN || align=right data-sort-value="0.91" | 910 m || 
|-id=753 bgcolor=#E9E9E9
| 344753 ||  || — || October 17, 2003 || Apache Point || SDSS || — || align=right | 1.1 km || 
|-id=754 bgcolor=#E9E9E9
| 344754 ||  || — || July 23, 2003 || Palomar || NEAT || — || align=right | 1.8 km || 
|-id=755 bgcolor=#E9E9E9
| 344755 ||  || — || November 4, 2003 || Socorro || LINEAR || — || align=right | 2.5 km || 
|-id=756 bgcolor=#FFC2E0
| 344756 ||  || — || November 14, 2003 || Palomar || NEAT || AMO || align=right data-sort-value="0.25" | 250 m || 
|-id=757 bgcolor=#E9E9E9
| 344757 ||  || — || October 25, 2003 || Socorro || LINEAR || — || align=right | 3.0 km || 
|-id=758 bgcolor=#E9E9E9
| 344758 ||  || — || November 18, 2003 || Kitt Peak || Spacewatch || — || align=right | 2.2 km || 
|-id=759 bgcolor=#E9E9E9
| 344759 ||  || — || November 18, 2003 || Kitt Peak || Spacewatch || — || align=right | 2.4 km || 
|-id=760 bgcolor=#E9E9E9
| 344760 ||  || — || November 18, 2003 || Palomar || NEAT || — || align=right | 1.9 km || 
|-id=761 bgcolor=#E9E9E9
| 344761 ||  || — || November 19, 2003 || Palomar || NEAT || — || align=right | 3.4 km || 
|-id=762 bgcolor=#E9E9E9
| 344762 ||  || — || November 19, 2003 || Kitt Peak || Spacewatch || WIT || align=right | 1.5 km || 
|-id=763 bgcolor=#E9E9E9
| 344763 ||  || — || November 19, 2003 || Kitt Peak || Spacewatch || JUN || align=right | 1.2 km || 
|-id=764 bgcolor=#d6d6d6
| 344764 ||  || — || November 19, 2003 || Kitt Peak || Spacewatch || — || align=right | 3.3 km || 
|-id=765 bgcolor=#E9E9E9
| 344765 ||  || — || November 20, 2003 || Socorro || LINEAR || — || align=right | 2.9 km || 
|-id=766 bgcolor=#E9E9E9
| 344766 ||  || — || November 21, 2003 || Socorro || LINEAR || — || align=right | 3.0 km || 
|-id=767 bgcolor=#E9E9E9
| 344767 ||  || — || November 19, 2003 || Anderson Mesa || LONEOS || — || align=right | 2.2 km || 
|-id=768 bgcolor=#d6d6d6
| 344768 ||  || — || November 19, 2003 || Anderson Mesa || LONEOS || — || align=right | 2.1 km || 
|-id=769 bgcolor=#E9E9E9
| 344769 ||  || — || November 19, 2003 || Anderson Mesa || LONEOS || PAD || align=right | 2.9 km || 
|-id=770 bgcolor=#E9E9E9
| 344770 ||  || — || November 21, 2003 || Socorro || LINEAR || — || align=right | 3.5 km || 
|-id=771 bgcolor=#E9E9E9
| 344771 ||  || — || November 21, 2003 || Palomar || NEAT || — || align=right | 3.2 km || 
|-id=772 bgcolor=#E9E9E9
| 344772 ||  || — || November 20, 2003 || Socorro || LINEAR || — || align=right | 1.9 km || 
|-id=773 bgcolor=#E9E9E9
| 344773 ||  || — || November 24, 2003 || Socorro || LINEAR || HNA || align=right | 2.8 km || 
|-id=774 bgcolor=#E9E9E9
| 344774 ||  || — || November 24, 2003 || Anderson Mesa || LONEOS || — || align=right | 2.3 km || 
|-id=775 bgcolor=#E9E9E9
| 344775 ||  || — || November 26, 2003 || Kitt Peak || Spacewatch || — || align=right | 2.8 km || 
|-id=776 bgcolor=#E9E9E9
| 344776 ||  || — || November 18, 2003 || Anderson Mesa || LONEOS || — || align=right | 4.0 km || 
|-id=777 bgcolor=#E9E9E9
| 344777 ||  || — || November 21, 2003 || Catalina || CSS || — || align=right | 2.5 km || 
|-id=778 bgcolor=#E9E9E9
| 344778 ||  || — || November 24, 2003 || Anderson Mesa || LONEOS || AEO || align=right | 1.4 km || 
|-id=779 bgcolor=#E9E9E9
| 344779 ||  || — || November 23, 2003 || Anderson Mesa || LONEOS || — || align=right | 2.8 km || 
|-id=780 bgcolor=#E9E9E9
| 344780 ||  || — || November 19, 2003 || Kitt Peak || Spacewatch || NEM || align=right | 2.4 km || 
|-id=781 bgcolor=#E9E9E9
| 344781 ||  || — || December 1, 2003 || Socorro || LINEAR || AEO || align=right | 1.4 km || 
|-id=782 bgcolor=#E9E9E9
| 344782 ||  || — || December 3, 2003 || Anderson Mesa || LONEOS || — || align=right | 3.0 km || 
|-id=783 bgcolor=#E9E9E9
| 344783 ||  || — || December 4, 2003 || Socorro || LINEAR || — || align=right | 5.2 km || 
|-id=784 bgcolor=#E9E9E9
| 344784 ||  || — || December 15, 2003 || Palomar || NEAT || — || align=right | 3.1 km || 
|-id=785 bgcolor=#E9E9E9
| 344785 ||  || — || December 1, 2003 || Kitt Peak || Spacewatch || — || align=right | 2.6 km || 
|-id=786 bgcolor=#E9E9E9
| 344786 ||  || — || December 1, 2003 || Kitt Peak || Spacewatch || — || align=right | 3.8 km || 
|-id=787 bgcolor=#E9E9E9
| 344787 ||  || — || December 1, 2003 || Kitt Peak || Spacewatch || PAD || align=right | 1.4 km || 
|-id=788 bgcolor=#E9E9E9
| 344788 ||  || — || December 1, 2003 || Kitt Peak || Spacewatch || AGN || align=right | 1.1 km || 
|-id=789 bgcolor=#E9E9E9
| 344789 ||  || — || December 4, 2003 || Socorro || LINEAR || — || align=right | 2.5 km || 
|-id=790 bgcolor=#E9E9E9
| 344790 ||  || — || December 19, 2003 || Kitt Peak || Spacewatch || PAD || align=right | 1.6 km || 
|-id=791 bgcolor=#E9E9E9
| 344791 ||  || — || December 18, 2003 || Socorro || LINEAR || — || align=right | 2.5 km || 
|-id=792 bgcolor=#E9E9E9
| 344792 ||  || — || December 19, 2003 || Socorro || LINEAR || — || align=right | 2.9 km || 
|-id=793 bgcolor=#E9E9E9
| 344793 ||  || — || December 21, 2003 || Socorro || LINEAR || GAL || align=right | 2.1 km || 
|-id=794 bgcolor=#E9E9E9
| 344794 ||  || — || December 27, 2003 || Socorro || LINEAR || — || align=right | 3.0 km || 
|-id=795 bgcolor=#E9E9E9
| 344795 ||  || — || December 28, 2003 || Socorro || LINEAR || — || align=right | 3.4 km || 
|-id=796 bgcolor=#E9E9E9
| 344796 ||  || — || December 29, 2003 || Socorro || LINEAR || — || align=right | 2.4 km || 
|-id=797 bgcolor=#E9E9E9
| 344797 ||  || — || December 29, 2003 || Catalina || CSS || — || align=right | 3.4 km || 
|-id=798 bgcolor=#E9E9E9
| 344798 ||  || — || December 29, 2003 || Catalina || CSS || — || align=right | 2.9 km || 
|-id=799 bgcolor=#E9E9E9
| 344799 ||  || — || December 17, 2003 || Kitt Peak || Spacewatch || — || align=right | 2.2 km || 
|-id=800 bgcolor=#C2FFFF
| 344800 ||  || — || December 22, 2003 || Kitt Peak || Spacewatch || L5 || align=right | 11 km || 
|}

344801–344900 

|-bgcolor=#E9E9E9
| 344801 ||  || — || December 22, 2003 || Socorro || LINEAR || — || align=right | 2.8 km || 
|-id=802 bgcolor=#E9E9E9
| 344802 ||  || — || January 16, 2004 || Kitt Peak || Spacewatch || DOR || align=right | 3.3 km || 
|-id=803 bgcolor=#E9E9E9
| 344803 ||  || — || January 19, 2004 || Anderson Mesa || LONEOS || — || align=right | 2.3 km || 
|-id=804 bgcolor=#d6d6d6
| 344804 ||  || — || January 19, 2004 || Kitt Peak || Spacewatch || — || align=right | 2.7 km || 
|-id=805 bgcolor=#d6d6d6
| 344805 ||  || — || January 19, 2004 || Kitt Peak || Spacewatch || SAN || align=right | 1.6 km || 
|-id=806 bgcolor=#FA8072
| 344806 ||  || — || January 22, 2004 || Palomar || NEAT || — || align=right | 1.0 km || 
|-id=807 bgcolor=#d6d6d6
| 344807 ||  || — || January 21, 2004 || Socorro || LINEAR || — || align=right | 4.1 km || 
|-id=808 bgcolor=#E9E9E9
| 344808 ||  || — || January 21, 2004 || Socorro || LINEAR || MRX || align=right | 1.2 km || 
|-id=809 bgcolor=#E9E9E9
| 344809 ||  || — || January 31, 2004 || Socorro || LINEAR || — || align=right | 3.0 km || 
|-id=810 bgcolor=#d6d6d6
| 344810 ||  || — || January 16, 2004 || Kitt Peak || Spacewatch || — || align=right | 2.2 km || 
|-id=811 bgcolor=#d6d6d6
| 344811 ||  || — || January 19, 2004 || Kitt Peak || Spacewatch || KAR || align=right | 1.0 km || 
|-id=812 bgcolor=#fefefe
| 344812 ||  || — || January 20, 2004 || Cerro Paranal || Paranal Obs. || — || align=right data-sort-value="0.65" | 650 m || 
|-id=813 bgcolor=#E9E9E9
| 344813 ||  || — || February 9, 2004 || Palomar || NEAT || — || align=right | 4.1 km || 
|-id=814 bgcolor=#d6d6d6
| 344814 ||  || — || February 11, 2004 || Kitt Peak || Spacewatch || HYG || align=right | 3.0 km || 
|-id=815 bgcolor=#d6d6d6
| 344815 ||  || — || February 11, 2004 || Palomar || NEAT || — || align=right | 3.4 km || 
|-id=816 bgcolor=#fefefe
| 344816 ||  || — || February 12, 2004 || Kitt Peak || Spacewatch || FLO || align=right data-sort-value="0.85" | 850 m || 
|-id=817 bgcolor=#fefefe
| 344817 ||  || — || February 17, 2004 || Socorro || LINEAR || — || align=right data-sort-value="0.93" | 930 m || 
|-id=818 bgcolor=#fefefe
| 344818 ||  || — || February 23, 2004 || Socorro || LINEAR || — || align=right data-sort-value="0.88" | 880 m || 
|-id=819 bgcolor=#fefefe
| 344819 ||  || — || March 10, 2004 || Palomar || NEAT || — || align=right data-sort-value="0.98" | 980 m || 
|-id=820 bgcolor=#d6d6d6
| 344820 ||  || — || March 11, 2004 || Palomar || NEAT || — || align=right | 3.8 km || 
|-id=821 bgcolor=#fefefe
| 344821 ||  || — || March 12, 2004 || Palomar || NEAT || V || align=right data-sort-value="0.75" | 750 m || 
|-id=822 bgcolor=#d6d6d6
| 344822 ||  || — || March 13, 2004 || Palomar || NEAT || — || align=right | 4.0 km || 
|-id=823 bgcolor=#d6d6d6
| 344823 ||  || — || March 10, 2004 || Palomar || NEAT || — || align=right | 3.5 km || 
|-id=824 bgcolor=#d6d6d6
| 344824 ||  || — || March 11, 2004 || Palomar || NEAT || URS || align=right | 4.9 km || 
|-id=825 bgcolor=#d6d6d6
| 344825 ||  || — || March 14, 2004 || Catalina || CSS || — || align=right | 4.3 km || 
|-id=826 bgcolor=#fefefe
| 344826 ||  || — || March 12, 2004 || Palomar || NEAT || — || align=right data-sort-value="0.96" | 960 m || 
|-id=827 bgcolor=#fefefe
| 344827 ||  || — || March 15, 2004 || Kitt Peak || Spacewatch || — || align=right data-sort-value="0.87" | 870 m || 
|-id=828 bgcolor=#d6d6d6
| 344828 ||  || — || March 15, 2004 || Kitt Peak || Spacewatch || TIR || align=right | 3.4 km || 
|-id=829 bgcolor=#d6d6d6
| 344829 ||  || — || March 16, 2004 || Socorro || LINEAR || — || align=right | 2.7 km || 
|-id=830 bgcolor=#fefefe
| 344830 ||  || — || March 25, 2004 || Wrightwood || J. W. Young || — || align=right data-sort-value="0.68" | 680 m || 
|-id=831 bgcolor=#d6d6d6
| 344831 ||  || — || March 16, 2004 || Catalina || CSS || — || align=right | 3.5 km || 
|-id=832 bgcolor=#d6d6d6
| 344832 ||  || — || March 17, 2004 || Kitt Peak || Spacewatch || — || align=right | 2.4 km || 
|-id=833 bgcolor=#d6d6d6
| 344833 ||  || — || March 16, 2004 || Socorro || LINEAR || — || align=right | 3.5 km || 
|-id=834 bgcolor=#fefefe
| 344834 ||  || — || March 18, 2004 || Kitt Peak || Spacewatch || — || align=right data-sort-value="0.85" | 850 m || 
|-id=835 bgcolor=#fefefe
| 344835 ||  || — || March 19, 2004 || Socorro || LINEAR || — || align=right data-sort-value="0.95" | 950 m || 
|-id=836 bgcolor=#fefefe
| 344836 ||  || — || March 20, 2004 || Socorro || LINEAR || — || align=right data-sort-value="0.79" | 790 m || 
|-id=837 bgcolor=#d6d6d6
| 344837 ||  || — || March 22, 2004 || Socorro || LINEAR || EUP || align=right | 4.4 km || 
|-id=838 bgcolor=#fefefe
| 344838 ||  || — || March 21, 2004 || Kitt Peak || Spacewatch || — || align=right | 1.1 km || 
|-id=839 bgcolor=#d6d6d6
| 344839 ||  || — || March 27, 2004 || Anderson Mesa || LONEOS || Tj (2.96) || align=right | 4.6 km || 
|-id=840 bgcolor=#d6d6d6
| 344840 ||  || — || March 19, 2004 || Palomar || NEAT || — || align=right | 3.6 km || 
|-id=841 bgcolor=#d6d6d6
| 344841 ||  || — || March 28, 2004 || Kitt Peak || Spacewatch || — || align=right | 4.5 km || 
|-id=842 bgcolor=#fefefe
| 344842 ||  || — || March 17, 2004 || Kitt Peak || Spacewatch || — || align=right data-sort-value="0.81" | 810 m || 
|-id=843 bgcolor=#fefefe
| 344843 ||  || — || April 11, 2004 || Palomar || NEAT || — || align=right | 1.0 km || 
|-id=844 bgcolor=#fefefe
| 344844 ||  || — || April 12, 2004 || Anderson Mesa || LONEOS || — || align=right | 1.0 km || 
|-id=845 bgcolor=#fefefe
| 344845 ||  || — || April 12, 2004 || Catalina || CSS || H || align=right data-sort-value="0.84" | 840 m || 
|-id=846 bgcolor=#fefefe
| 344846 ||  || — || April 14, 2004 || Kitt Peak || Spacewatch || — || align=right | 1.1 km || 
|-id=847 bgcolor=#fefefe
| 344847 ||  || — || April 12, 2004 || Anderson Mesa || LONEOS || — || align=right data-sort-value="0.91" | 910 m || 
|-id=848 bgcolor=#fefefe
| 344848 ||  || — || April 13, 2004 || Catalina || CSS || — || align=right | 1.2 km || 
|-id=849 bgcolor=#d6d6d6
| 344849 ||  || — || April 15, 2004 || Socorro || LINEAR || THB || align=right | 4.6 km || 
|-id=850 bgcolor=#fefefe
| 344850 ||  || — || April 12, 2004 || Kitt Peak || Spacewatch || — || align=right data-sort-value="0.76" | 760 m || 
|-id=851 bgcolor=#fefefe
| 344851 ||  || — || April 12, 2004 || Kitt Peak || Spacewatch || FLO || align=right data-sort-value="0.65" | 650 m || 
|-id=852 bgcolor=#d6d6d6
| 344852 ||  || — || April 14, 2004 || Kitt Peak || Spacewatch || — || align=right | 4.6 km || 
|-id=853 bgcolor=#d6d6d6
| 344853 ||  || — || April 13, 2004 || Kitt Peak || Spacewatch || — || align=right | 3.5 km || 
|-id=854 bgcolor=#d6d6d6
| 344854 ||  || — || April 14, 2004 || Kitt Peak || Spacewatch || — || align=right | 3.8 km || 
|-id=855 bgcolor=#d6d6d6
| 344855 ||  || — || April 16, 2004 || Palomar || NEAT || EUP || align=right | 5.1 km || 
|-id=856 bgcolor=#fefefe
| 344856 ||  || — || April 16, 2004 || Socorro || LINEAR || — || align=right data-sort-value="0.99" | 990 m || 
|-id=857 bgcolor=#d6d6d6
| 344857 ||  || — || April 19, 2004 || Socorro || LINEAR || — || align=right | 2.9 km || 
|-id=858 bgcolor=#d6d6d6
| 344858 ||  || — || April 21, 2004 || Socorro || LINEAR || — || align=right | 3.9 km || 
|-id=859 bgcolor=#d6d6d6
| 344859 ||  || — || April 16, 2004 || Kitt Peak || Spacewatch || — || align=right | 3.2 km || 
|-id=860 bgcolor=#fefefe
| 344860 ||  || — || April 21, 2004 || Socorro || LINEAR || NYS || align=right data-sort-value="0.66" | 660 m || 
|-id=861 bgcolor=#FA8072
| 344861 ||  || — || April 23, 2004 || Catalina || CSS || — || align=right | 1.0 km || 
|-id=862 bgcolor=#fefefe
| 344862 ||  || — || April 24, 2004 || Socorro || LINEAR || H || align=right data-sort-value="0.85" | 850 m || 
|-id=863 bgcolor=#fefefe
| 344863 ||  || — || April 23, 2004 || Kitt Peak || Spacewatch || — || align=right | 1.3 km || 
|-id=864 bgcolor=#d6d6d6
| 344864 ||  || — || April 25, 2004 || Kitt Peak || Spacewatch || — || align=right | 4.5 km || 
|-id=865 bgcolor=#fefefe
| 344865 ||  || — || May 9, 2004 || Kitt Peak || Spacewatch || V || align=right data-sort-value="0.86" | 860 m || 
|-id=866 bgcolor=#d6d6d6
| 344866 ||  || — || May 11, 2004 || Catalina || CSS || EUP || align=right | 4.9 km || 
|-id=867 bgcolor=#fefefe
| 344867 ||  || — || May 12, 2004 || Catalina || CSS || — || align=right | 1.3 km || 
|-id=868 bgcolor=#FA8072
| 344868 ||  || — || May 13, 2004 || Anderson Mesa || LONEOS || H || align=right data-sort-value="0.74" | 740 m || 
|-id=869 bgcolor=#fefefe
| 344869 ||  || — || May 13, 2004 || Socorro || LINEAR || PHO || align=right | 1.1 km || 
|-id=870 bgcolor=#fefefe
| 344870 ||  || — || May 13, 2004 || Kitt Peak || Spacewatch || — || align=right data-sort-value="0.90" | 900 m || 
|-id=871 bgcolor=#fefefe
| 344871 ||  || — || May 13, 2004 || Palomar || NEAT || — || align=right data-sort-value="0.92" | 920 m || 
|-id=872 bgcolor=#d6d6d6
| 344872 ||  || — || May 14, 2004 || Kitt Peak || Spacewatch || — || align=right | 4.8 km || 
|-id=873 bgcolor=#fefefe
| 344873 ||  || — || May 13, 2004 || Kitt Peak || Spacewatch || — || align=right data-sort-value="0.82" | 820 m || 
|-id=874 bgcolor=#fefefe
| 344874 ||  || — || July 9, 2004 || Palomar || NEAT || — || align=right | 4.2 km || 
|-id=875 bgcolor=#fefefe
| 344875 ||  || — || July 11, 2004 || Socorro || LINEAR || SVE || align=right | 2.4 km || 
|-id=876 bgcolor=#fefefe
| 344876 ||  || — || July 18, 2004 || Reedy Creek || J. Broughton || — || align=right | 1.1 km || 
|-id=877 bgcolor=#fefefe
| 344877 ||  || — || July 16, 2004 || Socorro || LINEAR || — || align=right data-sort-value="0.80" | 800 m || 
|-id=878 bgcolor=#fefefe
| 344878 ||  || — || August 7, 2004 || Palomar || NEAT || MAS || align=right data-sort-value="0.91" | 910 m || 
|-id=879 bgcolor=#fefefe
| 344879 ||  || — || August 7, 2004 || Campo Imperatore || CINEOS || — || align=right | 1.0 km || 
|-id=880 bgcolor=#fefefe
| 344880 ||  || — || August 8, 2004 || Palomar || NEAT || — || align=right | 1.1 km || 
|-id=881 bgcolor=#fefefe
| 344881 ||  || — || August 8, 2004 || Socorro || LINEAR || NYS || align=right data-sort-value="0.85" | 850 m || 
|-id=882 bgcolor=#fefefe
| 344882 ||  || — || August 10, 2004 || Socorro || LINEAR || V || align=right data-sort-value="0.90" | 900 m || 
|-id=883 bgcolor=#fefefe
| 344883 ||  || — || August 6, 2004 || Palomar || NEAT || — || align=right | 1.0 km || 
|-id=884 bgcolor=#fefefe
| 344884 ||  || — || August 8, 2004 || Socorro || LINEAR || NYS || align=right data-sort-value="0.86" | 860 m || 
|-id=885 bgcolor=#fefefe
| 344885 ||  || — || August 8, 2004 || Socorro || LINEAR || — || align=right | 1.4 km || 
|-id=886 bgcolor=#fefefe
| 344886 ||  || — || August 10, 2004 || Socorro || LINEAR || NYS || align=right data-sort-value="0.81" | 810 m || 
|-id=887 bgcolor=#fefefe
| 344887 ||  || — || August 11, 2004 || Socorro || LINEAR || — || align=right | 3.1 km || 
|-id=888 bgcolor=#fefefe
| 344888 ||  || — || August 11, 2004 || Socorro || LINEAR || — || align=right | 1.4 km || 
|-id=889 bgcolor=#fefefe
| 344889 ||  || — || August 15, 2004 || Cerro Tololo || M. W. Buie || NYS || align=right | 1.0 km || 
|-id=890 bgcolor=#fefefe
| 344890 ||  || — || September 6, 2004 || Siding Spring || SSS || — || align=right | 1.2 km || 
|-id=891 bgcolor=#fefefe
| 344891 ||  || — || September 7, 2004 || Socorro || LINEAR || NYS || align=right data-sort-value="0.89" | 890 m || 
|-id=892 bgcolor=#fefefe
| 344892 ||  || — || September 7, 2004 || Socorro || LINEAR || NYS || align=right data-sort-value="0.93" | 930 m || 
|-id=893 bgcolor=#E9E9E9
| 344893 ||  || — || September 7, 2004 || Kitt Peak || Spacewatch || — || align=right data-sort-value="0.90" | 900 m || 
|-id=894 bgcolor=#fefefe
| 344894 ||  || — || September 8, 2004 || Socorro || LINEAR || — || align=right data-sort-value="0.95" | 950 m || 
|-id=895 bgcolor=#fefefe
| 344895 ||  || — || September 8, 2004 || Socorro || LINEAR || SUL || align=right | 2.7 km || 
|-id=896 bgcolor=#fefefe
| 344896 ||  || — || September 8, 2004 || Socorro || LINEAR || NYS || align=right data-sort-value="0.77" | 770 m || 
|-id=897 bgcolor=#fefefe
| 344897 ||  || — || September 9, 2004 || Socorro || LINEAR || — || align=right data-sort-value="0.98" | 980 m || 
|-id=898 bgcolor=#fefefe
| 344898 ||  || — || September 8, 2004 || Socorro || LINEAR || — || align=right | 1.2 km || 
|-id=899 bgcolor=#fefefe
| 344899 ||  || — || September 8, 2004 || Campo Imperatore || CINEOS || V || align=right data-sort-value="0.88" | 880 m || 
|-id=900 bgcolor=#E9E9E9
| 344900 ||  || — || September 9, 2004 || Socorro || LINEAR || — || align=right data-sort-value="0.83" | 830 m || 
|}

344901–345000 

|-bgcolor=#E9E9E9
| 344901 ||  || — || September 7, 2004 || Palomar || NEAT || — || align=right data-sort-value="0.86" | 860 m || 
|-id=902 bgcolor=#fefefe
| 344902 ||  || — || September 8, 2004 || Socorro || LINEAR || — || align=right | 1.2 km || 
|-id=903 bgcolor=#fefefe
| 344903 ||  || — || September 9, 2004 || Socorro || LINEAR || MAS || align=right data-sort-value="0.95" | 950 m || 
|-id=904 bgcolor=#E9E9E9
| 344904 ||  || — || September 11, 2004 || Socorro || LINEAR || RAF || align=right | 1.0 km || 
|-id=905 bgcolor=#fefefe
| 344905 ||  || — || September 10, 2004 || Socorro || LINEAR || — || align=right | 1.3 km || 
|-id=906 bgcolor=#fefefe
| 344906 ||  || — || September 10, 2004 || Socorro || LINEAR || — || align=right | 1.2 km || 
|-id=907 bgcolor=#fefefe
| 344907 ||  || — || September 10, 2004 || Socorro || LINEAR || V || align=right data-sort-value="0.70" | 700 m || 
|-id=908 bgcolor=#fefefe
| 344908 ||  || — || September 10, 2004 || Socorro || LINEAR || — || align=right | 1.3 km || 
|-id=909 bgcolor=#fefefe
| 344909 ||  || — || September 11, 2004 || Socorro || LINEAR || — || align=right data-sort-value="0.89" | 890 m || 
|-id=910 bgcolor=#E9E9E9
| 344910 ||  || — || September 11, 2004 || Socorro || LINEAR || — || align=right | 2.2 km || 
|-id=911 bgcolor=#fefefe
| 344911 ||  || — || September 11, 2004 || Socorro || LINEAR || H || align=right data-sort-value="0.94" | 940 m || 
|-id=912 bgcolor=#fefefe
| 344912 ||  || — || September 10, 2004 || Kitt Peak || Spacewatch || NYS || align=right data-sort-value="0.66" | 660 m || 
|-id=913 bgcolor=#d6d6d6
| 344913 ||  || — || September 10, 2004 || Kitt Peak || Spacewatch || SHU3:2 || align=right | 5.3 km || 
|-id=914 bgcolor=#fefefe
| 344914 ||  || — || September 10, 2004 || Kitt Peak || Spacewatch || NYS || align=right data-sort-value="0.70" | 700 m || 
|-id=915 bgcolor=#fefefe
| 344915 ||  || — || September 13, 2004 || Kitt Peak || Spacewatch || H || align=right data-sort-value="0.60" | 600 m || 
|-id=916 bgcolor=#fefefe
| 344916 ||  || — || September 11, 2004 || Kitt Peak || Spacewatch || — || align=right | 1.5 km || 
|-id=917 bgcolor=#fefefe
| 344917 ||  || — || September 15, 2004 || Kitt Peak || Spacewatch || — || align=right | 1.6 km || 
|-id=918 bgcolor=#fefefe
| 344918 ||  || — || September 12, 2004 || Mauna Kea || P. A. Wiegert || NYS || align=right data-sort-value="0.62" | 620 m || 
|-id=919 bgcolor=#fefefe
| 344919 ||  || — || September 17, 2004 || Kitt Peak || Spacewatch || V || align=right data-sort-value="0.82" | 820 m || 
|-id=920 bgcolor=#E9E9E9
| 344920 ||  || — || October 4, 2004 || Kitt Peak || Spacewatch || — || align=right | 1.0 km || 
|-id=921 bgcolor=#fefefe
| 344921 ||  || — || October 5, 2004 || Anderson Mesa || LONEOS || H || align=right | 1.0 km || 
|-id=922 bgcolor=#fefefe
| 344922 ||  || — || September 8, 2004 || Socorro || LINEAR || H || align=right data-sort-value="0.87" | 870 m || 
|-id=923 bgcolor=#fefefe
| 344923 ||  || — || October 7, 2004 || Goodricke-Pigott || R. A. Tucker || — || align=right data-sort-value="0.87" | 870 m || 
|-id=924 bgcolor=#fefefe
| 344924 ||  || — || October 10, 2004 || Socorro || LINEAR || H || align=right | 1.1 km || 
|-id=925 bgcolor=#E9E9E9
| 344925 ||  || — || September 7, 2004 || Kitt Peak || Spacewatch || — || align=right data-sort-value="0.83" | 830 m || 
|-id=926 bgcolor=#E9E9E9
| 344926 ||  || — || October 4, 2004 || Kitt Peak || Spacewatch || — || align=right | 1.9 km || 
|-id=927 bgcolor=#d6d6d6
| 344927 ||  || — || October 5, 2004 || Kitt Peak || Spacewatch || SHU3:2 || align=right | 5.4 km || 
|-id=928 bgcolor=#E9E9E9
| 344928 ||  || — || October 5, 2004 || Kitt Peak || Spacewatch || — || align=right | 2.9 km || 
|-id=929 bgcolor=#E9E9E9
| 344929 ||  || — || October 5, 2004 || Kitt Peak || Spacewatch || — || align=right data-sort-value="0.80" | 800 m || 
|-id=930 bgcolor=#fefefe
| 344930 ||  || — || October 5, 2004 || Anderson Mesa || LONEOS || NYS || align=right data-sort-value="0.98" | 980 m || 
|-id=931 bgcolor=#E9E9E9
| 344931 ||  || — || October 7, 2004 || Socorro || LINEAR || — || align=right | 1.8 km || 
|-id=932 bgcolor=#fefefe
| 344932 ||  || — || October 9, 2004 || Socorro || LINEAR || NYScritical || align=right data-sort-value="0.69" | 690 m || 
|-id=933 bgcolor=#E9E9E9
| 344933 ||  || — || October 9, 2004 || Socorro || LINEAR || — || align=right | 1.1 km || 
|-id=934 bgcolor=#E9E9E9
| 344934 ||  || — || October 7, 2004 || Kitt Peak || Spacewatch || — || align=right | 1.6 km || 
|-id=935 bgcolor=#E9E9E9
| 344935 ||  || — || October 7, 2004 || Kitt Peak || Spacewatch || MAR || align=right | 1.3 km || 
|-id=936 bgcolor=#E9E9E9
| 344936 ||  || — || October 9, 2004 || Kitt Peak || Spacewatch || — || align=right | 1.0 km || 
|-id=937 bgcolor=#fefefe
| 344937 ||  || — || October 9, 2004 || Kitt Peak || Spacewatch || — || align=right | 1.4 km || 
|-id=938 bgcolor=#d6d6d6
| 344938 ||  || — || October 8, 2004 || Kitt Peak || Spacewatch || 3:2 || align=right | 3.4 km || 
|-id=939 bgcolor=#E9E9E9
| 344939 ||  || — || October 11, 2004 || Kitt Peak || Spacewatch || — || align=right | 1.5 km || 
|-id=940 bgcolor=#fefefe
| 344940 ||  || — || October 15, 2004 || Anderson Mesa || LONEOS || — || align=right | 1.5 km || 
|-id=941 bgcolor=#fefefe
| 344941 ||  || — || October 5, 2004 || Anderson Mesa || LONEOS || — || align=right | 1.4 km || 
|-id=942 bgcolor=#fefefe
| 344942 ||  || — || October 9, 2004 || Kitt Peak || Spacewatch || — || align=right | 1.2 km || 
|-id=943 bgcolor=#fefefe
| 344943 ||  || — || November 3, 2004 || Palomar || NEAT || — || align=right | 1.3 km || 
|-id=944 bgcolor=#fefefe
| 344944 ||  || — || November 3, 2004 || Kitt Peak || Spacewatch || NYS || align=right data-sort-value="0.72" | 720 m || 
|-id=945 bgcolor=#d6d6d6
| 344945 ||  || — || November 4, 2004 || Catalina || CSS || 3:2 || align=right | 5.5 km || 
|-id=946 bgcolor=#d6d6d6
| 344946 ||  || — || November 4, 2004 || Kitt Peak || Spacewatch || 3:2 || align=right | 3.0 km || 
|-id=947 bgcolor=#d6d6d6
| 344947 ||  || — || November 4, 2004 || Kitt Peak || Spacewatch || 3:2 || align=right | 4.0 km || 
|-id=948 bgcolor=#E9E9E9
| 344948 ||  || — || November 4, 2004 || Kitt Peak || Spacewatch || — || align=right | 1.2 km || 
|-id=949 bgcolor=#d6d6d6
| 344949 ||  || — || November 4, 2004 || Catalina || CSS || SHUTj (2.97) || align=right | 5.7 km || 
|-id=950 bgcolor=#E9E9E9
| 344950 ||  || — || November 4, 2004 || Catalina || CSS || — || align=right | 1.4 km || 
|-id=951 bgcolor=#E9E9E9
| 344951 ||  || — || November 10, 2004 || Kitt Peak || Spacewatch || ADE || align=right | 3.0 km || 
|-id=952 bgcolor=#d6d6d6
| 344952 ||  || — || November 11, 2004 || Goodricke-Pigott || Goodricke-Pigott Obs. || — || align=right | 3.8 km || 
|-id=953 bgcolor=#d6d6d6
| 344953 ||  || — || November 9, 2004 || Catalina || CSS || 3:2 || align=right | 4.8 km || 
|-id=954 bgcolor=#fefefe
| 344954 ||  || — || November 3, 2004 || Catalina || CSS || H || align=right data-sort-value="0.86" | 860 m || 
|-id=955 bgcolor=#d6d6d6
| 344955 ||  || — || November 4, 2004 || Kitt Peak || Spacewatch || 3:2 || align=right | 4.6 km || 
|-id=956 bgcolor=#E9E9E9
| 344956 ||  || — || November 4, 2004 || Kitt Peak || Spacewatch || — || align=right | 1.5 km || 
|-id=957 bgcolor=#E9E9E9
| 344957 ||  || — || November 9, 2004 || Mauna Kea || C. Veillet || — || align=right data-sort-value="0.85" | 850 m || 
|-id=958 bgcolor=#E9E9E9
| 344958 ||  || — || November 17, 2004 || Campo Imperatore || CINEOS || — || align=right | 1.4 km || 
|-id=959 bgcolor=#d6d6d6
| 344959 ||  || — || December 2, 2004 || Anderson Mesa || LONEOS || 3:2 || align=right | 6.2 km || 
|-id=960 bgcolor=#E9E9E9
| 344960 ||  || — || December 2, 2004 || Socorro || LINEAR || — || align=right | 1.7 km || 
|-id=961 bgcolor=#E9E9E9
| 344961 ||  || — || December 2, 2004 || Palomar || NEAT || — || align=right | 1.0 km || 
|-id=962 bgcolor=#E9E9E9
| 344962 ||  || — || December 7, 2004 || Socorro || LINEAR || — || align=right | 1.3 km || 
|-id=963 bgcolor=#E9E9E9
| 344963 ||  || — || December 8, 2004 || Socorro || LINEAR || — || align=right | 1.9 km || 
|-id=964 bgcolor=#E9E9E9
| 344964 ||  || — || December 8, 2004 || Socorro || LINEAR || — || align=right | 2.0 km || 
|-id=965 bgcolor=#E9E9E9
| 344965 ||  || — || December 8, 2004 || Socorro || LINEAR || — || align=right | 1.5 km || 
|-id=966 bgcolor=#E9E9E9
| 344966 ||  || — || December 8, 2004 || Socorro || LINEAR || — || align=right | 3.7 km || 
|-id=967 bgcolor=#E9E9E9
| 344967 ||  || — || December 9, 2004 || Catalina || CSS || — || align=right data-sort-value="0.83" | 830 m || 
|-id=968 bgcolor=#E9E9E9
| 344968 ||  || — || December 9, 2004 || Catalina || CSS || HNS || align=right | 1.7 km || 
|-id=969 bgcolor=#E9E9E9
| 344969 ||  || — || December 10, 2004 || Junk Bond || Junk Bond Obs. || — || align=right | 1.0 km || 
|-id=970 bgcolor=#E9E9E9
| 344970 ||  || — || December 14, 2004 || Campo Imperatore || CINEOS || — || align=right | 1.1 km || 
|-id=971 bgcolor=#E9E9E9
| 344971 ||  || — || December 10, 2004 || Kitt Peak || Spacewatch || MIT || align=right | 3.0 km || 
|-id=972 bgcolor=#E9E9E9
| 344972 ||  || — || December 10, 2004 || Socorro || LINEAR || — || align=right | 1.8 km || 
|-id=973 bgcolor=#E9E9E9
| 344973 ||  || — || December 9, 2004 || Catalina || CSS || — || align=right | 1.2 km || 
|-id=974 bgcolor=#E9E9E9
| 344974 ||  || — || December 11, 2004 || Socorro || LINEAR || GEF || align=right | 1.7 km || 
|-id=975 bgcolor=#E9E9E9
| 344975 ||  || — || December 12, 2004 || Kitt Peak || Spacewatch || — || align=right | 1.4 km || 
|-id=976 bgcolor=#E9E9E9
| 344976 ||  || — || December 11, 2004 || Socorro || LINEAR || — || align=right | 1.3 km || 
|-id=977 bgcolor=#E9E9E9
| 344977 ||  || — || December 12, 2004 || Kitt Peak || Spacewatch || — || align=right | 2.0 km || 
|-id=978 bgcolor=#E9E9E9
| 344978 ||  || — || December 12, 2004 || Kitt Peak || Spacewatch || — || align=right data-sort-value="0.96" | 960 m || 
|-id=979 bgcolor=#E9E9E9
| 344979 ||  || — || December 15, 2004 || Socorro || LINEAR || — || align=right | 2.0 km || 
|-id=980 bgcolor=#E9E9E9
| 344980 ||  || — || December 10, 2004 || Socorro || LINEAR || GER || align=right | 2.1 km || 
|-id=981 bgcolor=#E9E9E9
| 344981 ||  || — || December 14, 2004 || Socorro || LINEAR || — || align=right | 1.7 km || 
|-id=982 bgcolor=#E9E9E9
| 344982 ||  || — || December 14, 2004 || Socorro || LINEAR || GER || align=right | 1.5 km || 
|-id=983 bgcolor=#E9E9E9
| 344983 ||  || — || December 15, 2004 || Kitt Peak || Spacewatch || — || align=right | 1.8 km || 
|-id=984 bgcolor=#E9E9E9
| 344984 ||  || — || December 15, 2004 || Catalina || CSS || — || align=right | 1.7 km || 
|-id=985 bgcolor=#E9E9E9
| 344985 ||  || — || December 18, 2004 || Mount Lemmon || Mount Lemmon Survey || — || align=right | 1.2 km || 
|-id=986 bgcolor=#E9E9E9
| 344986 ||  || — || December 18, 2004 || Mount Lemmon || Mount Lemmon Survey || fast? || align=right | 1.3 km || 
|-id=987 bgcolor=#E9E9E9
| 344987 ||  || — || December 21, 2004 || Catalina || CSS || MAR || align=right | 1.6 km || 
|-id=988 bgcolor=#E9E9E9
| 344988 ||  || — || January 6, 2005 || Catalina || CSS || — || align=right | 1.3 km || 
|-id=989 bgcolor=#E9E9E9
| 344989 ||  || — || January 6, 2005 || Catalina || CSS || — || align=right | 1.4 km || 
|-id=990 bgcolor=#E9E9E9
| 344990 ||  || — || January 6, 2005 || Socorro || LINEAR || — || align=right | 2.5 km || 
|-id=991 bgcolor=#E9E9E9
| 344991 ||  || — || January 6, 2005 || Catalina || CSS || — || align=right | 1.3 km || 
|-id=992 bgcolor=#E9E9E9
| 344992 ||  || — || January 6, 2005 || Socorro || LINEAR || — || align=right | 2.1 km || 
|-id=993 bgcolor=#fefefe
| 344993 ||  || — || January 6, 2005 || Socorro || LINEAR || H || align=right | 1.0 km || 
|-id=994 bgcolor=#E9E9E9
| 344994 ||  || — || January 15, 2005 || Kvistaberg || UDAS || JUN || align=right | 1.5 km || 
|-id=995 bgcolor=#E9E9E9
| 344995 ||  || — || January 15, 2005 || Socorro || LINEAR || — || align=right | 1.5 km || 
|-id=996 bgcolor=#E9E9E9
| 344996 ||  || — || January 13, 2005 || Catalina || CSS || — || align=right | 1.9 km || 
|-id=997 bgcolor=#E9E9E9
| 344997 ||  || — || January 15, 2005 || Anderson Mesa || LONEOS || — || align=right | 1.5 km || 
|-id=998 bgcolor=#E9E9E9
| 344998 ||  || — || January 15, 2005 || Catalina || CSS || — || align=right | 2.2 km || 
|-id=999 bgcolor=#E9E9E9
| 344999 ||  || — || January 15, 2005 || Kitt Peak || Spacewatch || WIT || align=right | 1.0 km || 
|-id=000 bgcolor=#E9E9E9
| 345000 ||  || — || January 15, 2005 || Kitt Peak || Spacewatch || — || align=right | 2.0 km || 
|}

References

External links 
 Discovery Circumstances: Numbered Minor Planets (340001)–(345000) (IAU Minor Planet Center)

0344